= ViiV Healthcare =

Pharmaceutical company

- Type: Joint venture
- Industry: Pharmaceutical industry
- Founded: 2009; 17 years ago
- Headquarters: London, England, UK
- Area served: Worldwide
- Key people: Deborah Waterhouse (CEO)
- Products: Pharmaceuticals
- Owners: GSK plc (76.5%); Pfizer (13.5%); Shionogi (10%)
- Number of employees: c. 1,100 (2023)
- Website: viivhealthcare.com

ViiV Healthcare (/ˈviːv/ VEEV) is a British multinational pharmaceutical company specializing in the research and development of medicines to treat and prevent HIV/AIDS. Its global headquarters is located in London. The company was created as a joint venture by GSK and Pfizer in November 2009, with both companies transferring their HIV assets to the new company. In 2012, Shionogi joined the company. As of December 2023, 76.5% of the company is owned by GSK, 13.5% by Pfizer and 10% by Shionogi. According to The Financial Times, the company's co-ownership structure may change depending on the achievement of certain milestones.

ViiV Healthcare's products have a market share of approximately 32% of the global HIV therapy market, making it the second-largest healthcare company in the sector, after Gilead Sciences.

ViiV Healthcare's global headquarters are in London in the United Kingdom, and the company has sites in a number of other countries including the United States, Australia, Belgium, Canada, France, Germany, Italy, Japan, Mexico, the Netherlands, Portugal, Puerto Rico, Russia, Spain and Switzerland.

== Products ==
The company markets 17 products:

- Nucleoside reverse transcriptase inhibitors (NRTIs):
  - abacavir (brand name Ziagen)
  - lamivudine (brand names Epivir and 3TC)
  - zidovudine (brand name Retrovir and AZT)
- Non-nucleoside reverse transcriptase inhibitors (NNRTIs):
  - delavirdine (brand name Rescriptor, no longer available)
- Attachment inhibitors
  - fostemsavir (brand name Rukobia)
- Integrase strand transfer inhibitors (INSTIs):
  - dolutegravir (brand name Tivicay)
  - cabotegravir (brand names Apretude [as a single agent indicated for PrEP]; and Vocabria/Cabenuva [when co-administered with rilpivirine for HIV treatment – in partnership with Janssen Pharmaceuticals])
- Protease inhibitors:
  - fosamprenavir (brand names Lexiva and Telzir)
  - nelfinavir (brand name Viracept)
- Entry inhibitors:
  - maraviroc (brand names Selzentry and Celsentri)
- Antiretroviral fixed-dose combinations, including several single-pill regimens:
  - abacavir/lamivudine (brand names Epzicom and Kivexa)
  - abacavir/lamivudine/zidovudine (brand name Trizivir)
  - lamivudine/zidovudine (brand name Combivir)
  - abacavir/dolutegravir/lamivudine (brand name Triumeq)
  - dolutegravir/lamivudine (brand name Dovato)
  - dolutegravir/rilpivirine (brand name Juluca – in partnership with Janssen Pharmaceuticals)

== Treatment access programs ==
ViiV Healthcare has stated that it will continue the not-for-profit pricing schemes that Pfizer and GlaxoSmithKline had been involved in prior to the setting up of the company. This program covers all low- and middle-income countries, as well as all of Sub-Saharan Africa.

The company has also granted voluntary licenses to 14 generic companies to enable the low-cost manufacture and sale of generic versions of the company's products in specific countries and/or regions.

In March 2020, ViiV Healthcare announced the initiation of a study in partnership with University of South Carolina's Ryan White Program to determine the effectiveness of ride-sharing services in improving access to care for people living with HIV.

== See also ==
- Pharmaceutical industry in the United Kingdom
- List of pharmaceutical companies
