= Viral capsid inhibitor =

A viral capsid inhibitor is an antiviral drug that binds to viral capsid proteins and interferes with the assembly or dissasembly of the capsid thus blocking the replication of the virus. Assembly inhibitors are more common but disassembly (uncoating) inhibitors have also been identified. Individual viral capsid inhibitors typically bind selectively to the capsid of a single virus or a closely related group of viruses, making them unsuitable as broad-spectrum antivirals.

The most notable example of a viral capsid inhibitor is lenacapavir which has been approved for treating and preventing HIV-1 infections. Additional examples are presented in the table below.

Viral capsid inhibitors
Drug (INN)	Virus target	Regulatory status
Lenacapavir	Human immunodeficiency virus type 1 (HIV-1)	Approved in the European Union and United States for treatment of multidrug-resistant HIV-1 infection. Also approved as pre-exposure prophylaxis (PrEP) for HIV-1.
Pleconaril	Picornaviruses (including enteroviruses and rhinoviruses)	Advanced to late-stage clinical development, but was not granted approval and development was discontinued.
Neracorvir	Hepatitis B virus (HBV)	Investigational antiviral drug in phase III clinical trials for chronic HBV infection.
Canocapavir	Hepatitis B virus (HBV)	Investigational antiviral drug with phase III clinical trials for chronic HBV infection planned

== See also ==
- HIV capsid inhibition
