= Lenacapavir pacfosacil =

Investigational drug

Clinical data
- Other names: GS-4182

Identifiers
- IUPAC name: 2-[2-[4-[[4-chloro-7-[2-[(1S)-2-(3,5-difluorophenyl)-1-[[2-[(2S,4R)-5,5-difluoro-9-(trifluoromethyl)-7,8-diazatricyclo[4.3.0.02,4]nona-1(6),8-dien-7-yl]acetyl]amino]ethyl]-6-(3-methyl-3-methylsulfonylbut-1-ynyl)-3-pyridinyl]-1-(2,2,2-trifluoroethyl)indazol-3-yl]-methylsulfonylamino]-2-methyl-4-oxobutan-2-yl]-5-methyl-3-phosphonooxyphenyl]acetic acid
- CAS Number: 2937414-47-4
- PubChem CID: 168826121
- UNII: ZX69MH84LB

Chemical and physical data
- Formula: C_{53}H_{49}ClF_{10}N_{7}O_{12}PS_{2}
- Molar mass: 1296.54 g·mol^{−1}
- 3D model (JSmol): Interactive image
- SMILES: CC1=CC(=C(C(=C1)OP(=O)(O)O)C(C)(C)CC(=O)N(C2=NN(C3=C(C=CC(=C32)Cl)C4=C(N=C(C=C4)C#CC(C)(C)S(=O)(=O)C)[C@H](CC5=CC(=CC(=C5)F)F)NC(=O)CN6C7=C([C@H]8C[C@H]8C7(F)F)C(=N6)C(F)(F)F)CC(F)(F)F)S(=O)(=O)C)CC(=O)O
- InChI: InChI=InChI=1S/C53H49ClF10N7O12PS2/c1-25-14-27(19-40(74)75)43(37(15-25)83-84(76,77)78)49(2,3)22-39(73)71(86(7,81)82)48-42-35(54)11-10-32(45(42)70(68-48)24-51(57,58)59)31-9-8-30(12-13-50(4,5)85(6,79)80)65-44(31)36(18-26-16-28(55)20-29(56)17-26)66-38(72)23-69-47-41(46(67-69)53(62,63)64)33-21-34(33)52(47,60)61/h8-11,14-17,20,33-34,36H,18-19,21-24H2,1-7H3,(H,66,72)(H,74,75)(H2,76,77,78)/t33-,34+,36-/m0/s1; Key:XXPJRIWJFUQOCT-LFBNJJMOSA-N

Lenacapavir pacfosacil is an investigational new drug that is being developed by Gilead Sciences for the treatment of HIV-1 infections. It is an orally bioavailable along-acting prodrug of lenacapavir, a HIV capsid inhibitor.
