= Elipovimab =

Pharmaceutical compound

Elipovimab (formerly known as GS-9722) is a first in class of effector-enhanced broadly neutralizing HIV-1 antibodies for the targeted elimination of HIV infected cells and is as of 2020 in phase 1b clinical testing, designed with the goal of reducing or eliminating the HIV reservoir in patients.
