= Post-exposure prophylaxis =

Preventive medical treatment after exposure

- Other names: Post-exposure prevention

Post-exposure prophylaxis, also known as post-exposure prevention (PEP), is any preventive medical treatment started after exposure to a pathogen in order to prevent the infection from occurring.

It should be contrasted with pre-exposure prophylaxis, which is used before the patient has been exposed to the infective agent.

== COVID-19 ==
In 2021, the US FDA gave emergency use authorization (EUA) to bamlanivimab/etesevimab for post-exposure prophylaxis against COVID-19. However, due to its reduced effectiveness against Omicron variants of the SARS-CoV-2 virus, it is no longer recommended for this purpose.

Ensitrelvir has been studied for its potential use as post-exposure prophylaxis against COVID-19 in a phase 3 clinical trial. In 2025, the SCORPIO-PEP trial found the treatment with ensitrelvir significantly reduced the incidence of symptomatic COVID-19 in people who had a household exposure to the illness compared to a placebo. In clinical observations, only 2.9% of the ensitrelvir group developed symptoms, versus 9.0% in the control group, representing a 67% reduction in risk. In September 2025, the FDA accepted a New Drug Application from the manufacturer for ensitrelvir as PEP for COVID-19, and was approved for this use on 29 May 2026.

== Rabies ==
PEP is commonly and very effectively used to prevent the onset of rabies after a bite by a suspected-rabid animal, since diagnostic tools are not available to detect rabies infection prior to the onset of the nearly always-fatal disease. The treatment consists of a series of injections of rabies vaccine and immunoglobulin. Rabies vaccine is given to both humans and animals who have been potentially exposed to rabies.

As of 2018, the average estimated cost of rabies post-exposure prophylaxis was US$108 (along with travel costs and loss of income).

== Tetanus ==
Tetanus toxoid can be given in case of a suspected exposure to tetanus. In such cases, it can be given with or without tetanus immunoglobulin (also called tetanus antibodies or tetanus antitoxin). It can be given as intravenous therapy or by intramuscular injection.

The guidelines for such events in the United States for non-pregnant people 11 years and older are as follows:

Vaccination status	Clean, minor wounds	All other wounds
Unknown or fewer than three doses of tetanus toxoid containing vaccine	Tdap and recommend catch-up vaccination	Tdap and recommend catch-up vaccination Tetanus immunoglobulin
Three or more doses of tetanus toxoid containing vaccine AND less than 5 years since last dose	No indication	No indication
Three or more doses of tetanus toxoid containing vaccine AND 5–10 years since last dose	No indication	Tdap preferred (if not yet received) or Td
Three or more doses of tetanus toxoid containing vaccine AND more than 10 years since last dose	Tdap preferred (if not yet received) or Td	Tdap preferred (if not yet received) or Td

== HIV ==
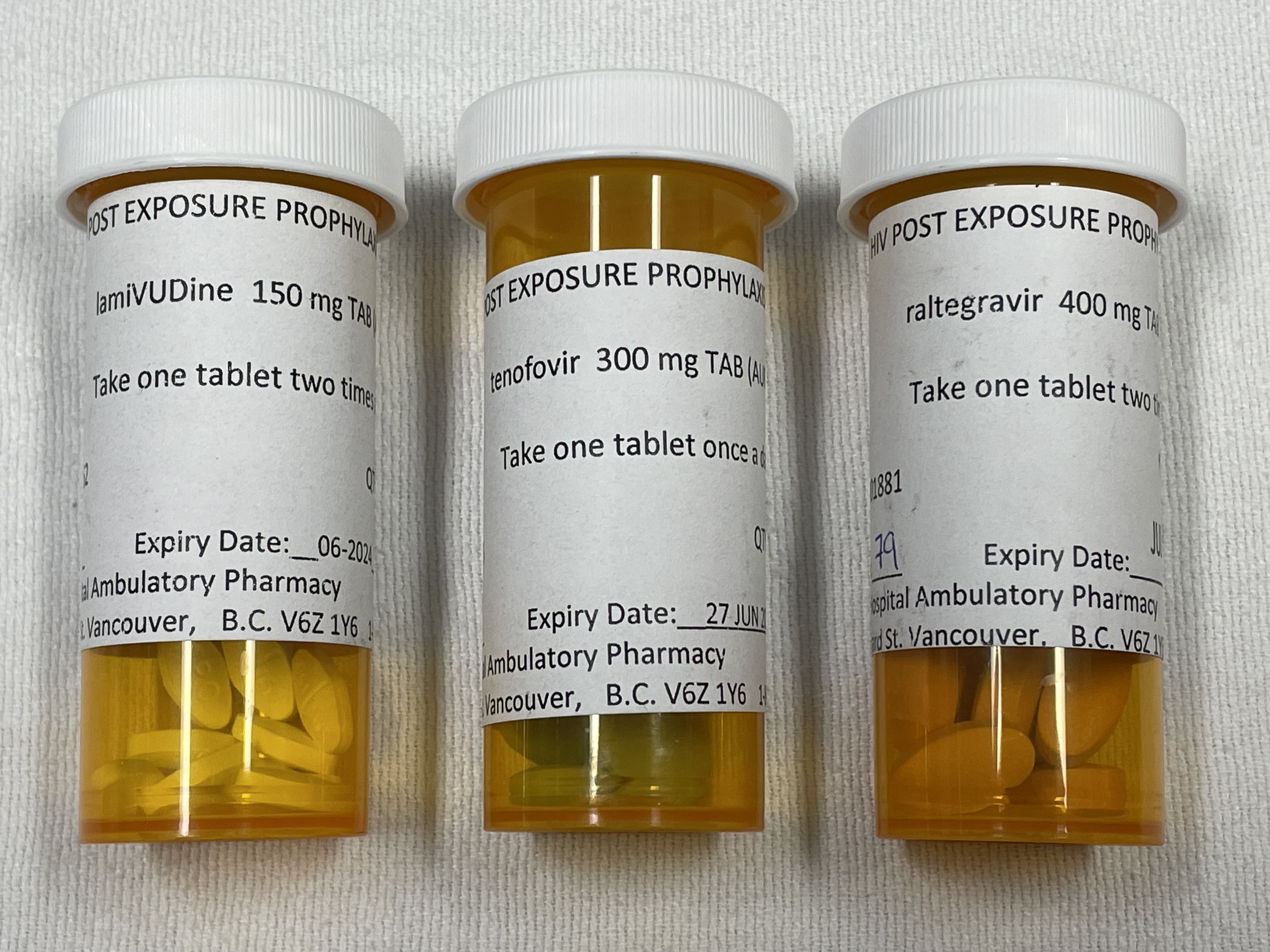
HIV post exposure prophylaxis medication used in Canada in 2023 include a combination of lamivudine, tenofovir, and raltegravir

=== History ===
AZT was approved as a treatment for AIDS in 1987. Healthcare workers would occasionally be exposed to HIV during work. Some people thought to try giving health care workers AZT to prevent seroconversion. This practice dramatically decreased the incidence of seroconversion among health workers when done under certain conditions.

Later the questions arose of whether to give HIV treatment after known exposure or high risk of exposure. Early data from preclinical studies established the efficacy of AZT in preventing transmission of HIV infection. AZT was also seen to reduce maternal-infant transmission of HIV in a randomized controlled trial, suggesting AZT's post-exposure prophylaxis (PEP) use. Subsequent data show combination antiretroviral therapy is significantly superior than AZT in reducing perinatal transmission rates. In addition, AZT is generally no longer recommended due to poor tolerance resulting in high rates of patient noncompliance.

Non-occupational exposures include cases when a condom breaks while a person with HIV has sex with an HIV-negative person in a single incidence, or in the case of unprotected sex with an anonymous partner, or in the case of a non-habitual incident of sharing a syringe for injection drug use. Evidence suggests that PEP also reduces the risk of HIV infection in these cases. In 2005, the US DHHS released the first recommendations for non-occupational PEP (nPEP) use to lower risk of HIV infection after exposures. The recommendations were replaced with an updated guideline in 2016.

Occupational exposures include needlestick injury of health care professionals from an HIV-infected source. In 2012, the US DHHS included guidelines on occupational PEP (oPEP) use for individuals with HIV exposures occurring in health care settings.

Since taking HIV-attacking medications shortly after exposure was proven to reduce the risk of contracting HIV, this led to research into pre-exposure prophylaxis by taking medication before a potential exposure to HIV occurred.

A report from early 2013 revealed that a female baby born with the HIV virus displayed no sign of the virus two years after high doses of three antiretroviral drugs were administered within 30 hours of her birth. The findings of the case were presented at the 2013 Conference on Retroviruses and Opportunistic Infections in Atlanta, U.S. and the baby is from Mississippi, U.S. The baby—known as the "Mississippi baby"—was considered to be the first child to be "functionally cured" of HIV. However, HIV re-emerged in the child as of July 2014.

=== Risk evaluation ===
Initiation of post-exposure prophylaxis with the use of antiretroviral drugs is dependent on a number of risk factors, though treatment is usually started after one high-risk event. In order to determine whether post-exposure prophylaxis is indicated, an evaluation visit will be conducted to consider risk factors associated with developing HIV. Assessments at this visit will include whether the at-risk person or the potential source-person are HIV positive, details around the potential HIV exposure event, including timing and circumstances, whether other high-risk events have occurred in the past, testing for sexually transmitted diseases, testing for hepatitis B and C (nPEP is also effective against hepatitis B), and pregnancy tests for women of childbearing potential.

Risk factors for developing HIV includes exposure of mucous membranes (vagina, rectum, eye, mouth, broken skin or under the skin) of an HIV-negative person to bodily fluids (blood, semen, rectal secretions, vaginal secretions, breast milk) of a person known to be HIV positive. For example, having unprotected sex with HIV positive partner is considered risky, but sharing sex toys, spitting and biting considered to be negligible risks for initiating post-exposure prophylaxis. The highest non-sexual risk is blood transfusion and the highest sexual contact risk is receptive anal intercourse. The timing of exposure does not affect the risk of developing HIV, but it does alter whether post-exposure prophylaxis will be recommended. Exposures that occurred 72 hours or less to beginning treatment are eligible for post-exposure prophylaxis. If the exposure occurred over 73 hours prior to treatment initiation, post-exposure prophylaxis is not indicated.

=== Testing ===
Initial HIV testing: Before initiating PEP after potential HIV exposure, persons should be tested for HIV1 and HIV2 antigens and antibodies in the blood using a rapid diagnostic test. PEP should only be started if rapid diagnostic test reveals no HIV infection present or if tests results are not available. However, if HIV infection is already present then PEP should not be started. HIV testing should be repeated four to six weeks and three months after exposure.

People may experience signs and symptoms of acute HIV infection, including fever, fatigue, myalgia, and skin rash, while taking PEP. CDC recommends seeking medical attention for evaluation if these signs and symptoms occur during or after the month of PEP. If follow-up laboratory antibody tests reveal HIV infection, HIV treatment specialists should be sought out and PEP should not be discontinued until person is evaluated and treatment plan is established.

STI and HBV testing: People with potential exposure to HIV are also at risk of acquiring STI and HBV. Centers for Disease Control and Prevention (CDC) recommends STI-specific nucleic acid amplification testing (NAAT) for gonorrhea and chlamydia and blood tests for syphilis. PEP is also active against HBV infections so discontinuation of medication can cause the reactivation of HBV, though rare. Health care providers must monitor HBV status closely.

Follow up testing: Serum creatinine and estimated creatinine clearance should be measured at baseline to determine the most appropriate PEP antiretroviral regimen. While on PEP, liver function, renal function, and hematologic parameters should be monitored.

=== Treatment ===
In the case of HIV exposure, post-exposure prophylaxis (PEP) is a course of antiretroviral drugs which reduces the risk of seroconversion after events with high risk of exposure to HIV (e.g., unprotected anal or vaginal sex, needlestick injuries, or sharing needles). The CDC recommends PEP for any HIV-negative person who has recently been exposed to HIV for any reason.

To be most effective, treatment should begin within an hour of exposure. After 72 hours PEP is much less effective, and may not be effective at all. Prophylactic treatment for HIV typically lasts four weeks.

While there is compelling data to suggest that PEP after HIV exposure is effective, there have been cases where it has failed. Failure has often been attributed to the delay in receiving treatment (greater than 72 hours post-exposure), the level of exposure, and/or the duration of treatment (lack of adherence to the 28-day regimen). In addition, since the time and level of non-occupational exposures are self-reported, there is no absolute data on the administration timeframe to which PEP would be efficacious. The standard antibody window period begins after the last day of PEP treatment. People who received PEP are typically advised to get an antibody test at 6 months post-exposure as well as the standard 3 month test.

The antiretroviral regimens used in PEP are the same as common highly active antiretroviral therapies used to treat HIV/AIDS. As of May 2025, CDC Guidelines recommend that adults and adolescents without contraindications receive a 28-day, once-daily regimen consisting of either:

- bictegravir/emtricitabine/tenofovir alafenamide, or
- dolutegravir plus tenofovir alafenamide or tenofovir disoproxil fumarate in combination with emtricitabine or lamivudine.

People initiating nPEP treatment typically receive a 28-day starter pack rather than a 3–7 day starter pack, to facilitate strong medication adherence. They should also be counseled on unpleasant side effects including malaise, fatigue, diarrhea, headache, nausea, vomiting, and insomnia, depending on the medication administered.

People at high risk for re-exposure due to unprotected intercourse or other behavioral factors should begin PrEP immediately after the completion of the nPEP treatment course. Conversely, if a medically adherent patient is already taking PrEP medication upon non-occupational exposure, nPEP treatment is not necessary.

== Hepatitis A ==
For exposure to hepatitis A, human normal immunoglobulin (HNIG) and/or hepatitis A vaccine may be used as PEP depending on the clinical situation.

== Hepatitis B ==
If the person exposed is an HBsAg positive source (a known responder to HBV vaccine) then if exposed to hepatitis B a booster dose should be given. If they are in the process of being vaccinated or are a non-responder they need to have hepatitis B immune globulin (HBIG) and the vaccine. For known non-responders HBIG and the vaccine should be given whilst those in the process of being vaccinated should have an accelerated course of HBV vaccine.

== Hepatitis C ==
Persons exposed to hepatitis C should be tested monthly with PCR, and if seroconversion occurs then treatment with interferon, or possibly ribavirin.

== Anthrax ==
A 60-day course of oral ciprofloxacin should be given when exposure to anthrax is suspected.

== Lyme disease ==
A single 200 milligram oral dose of doxycycline may be used within 3 days of a deer tick bite in a high risk area (such as New England), if the tick was attached for at least 36 hours.

== Poxviruses ==
The smallpox vaccine decreases the incidence risk of severe illness when administered after exposure to mpox and smallpox. The CDC advises "that smallpox vaccine be given within 4 days from the date of exposure to prevent onset of the disease but should be offered up to 14 days post-exposure"; the NHS concurs with this but also urges to vaccinate as soon as possible after exposure.

== See also ==
- Pre-exposure prophylaxis (PrEP)
