= Sarah Fidler =

Immunologist, researcher and professor

Sarah Fidler FRCP
- Citizenship: United Kingdom
- Education: King's College London (MBBS Medicine); Imperial College London (PhD)
- Known for: Professor in HIV Medicine testing new approaches towards curing HIV
- Children: 3
- Scientific career
- Fields: HIV medicine; Immunology; Microbiology
- Workplaces: Imperial College London; St. Mary's Hospital, London

Sarah Fidler is a British immunologist, researcher and professor in HIV Medicine at Imperial College London and consultant physician in HIV for St Mary's Hospital, London.

Her clinical work involves looking after people who have just been infected with the human immunodeficiency virus (HIV), and testing new approaches towards curing HIV.

== Career and research ==
Fidler grew up in Hull, a fishing town in East Yorkshire, England. Fidler first qualified as a doctor at King's College London in 1989 she saw that young people were dying of HIV. It wasn't for another six years, that life-saving antiretroviral treatment for HIV was made available and first rolled out in 1995.

Fidler became a Fellow of the Royal College of Physicians in 1992 and undertook her PhD at Imperial College London from 1994 to 1998. Fidler has stated that it was the passion of some of those living with HIV, whom she had the privilege to treat, that has driven her research career. She has worked at the Department of Medicine at Imperial College London since 2016, which has been revealed as one of the top three UK institutions publishing work on HIV/AIDS research.

=== 'Kick and kill' approach ===
The speed of the research has been made possible because of the advocacy community that stands behind it.... In our most recent trial, no-one dropped out, which is practically unheard of.
It's still a very stigmatising condition. People don't feel comfortable with talking about it, as they might with diabetes or cancer. I think it motivates this collaboration. People still feel that they are somehow different and that's what makes people join together, they relate to these other people who have the virus. They are a potent advocacy force.

— Professor Sarah Fidler, The Guardian, 30 November 2018,

Between 2015 and 2017, Fidler led a study testing the efficacy of the "kick and kill" strategy in HIV which aimed at waking up resting HIV cells out of their sleep so they can be identified and then eliminated.

The findings of this phase 2 trial, published in The Lancet in 2020, demonstrated that the approach was safe with participants adhering to the protocol and the approach "conferred no significant benefit compared with ART alone on measures of the HIV reservoir. Although this does not disprove the efficacy of the kick and kill strategy, for future trials enhancement of both kick and kill agents will be required."

=== Bone marrow replacement and HIV remission ===
The first reported case of a patient, Timothy Ray Brown, with sustained remission from HIV-1 after ceasing treatment was known as "the Berlin patient". In 2019, some ten years after "the Berlin patient", a report of a second HIV-1 patient in remission was published in Nature. The research, funded by Wellcome and the Medical Research Council among others, and led by researchers at University College London and Imperial College London with partners at the University of Cambridge and the University of Oxford, evidenced that a second HIV-1 patient had indeed achieved sustained remission for 18 months following bone marrow replacement.

Fidler questioned the feasibility of this invasive treatment being scaled up stating:

The report of a second case of HIV remission is of great interest but does not move the scientific field forward very significantly over the Berlin patient. Rather, it reinforces the science that this is rare but feasible.... The main important message from this report is that dCCR5 homozygous bone marrow donors should be specifically selected where possible for people living with HIV on ART (anti-retroviral therapy), who develop cancer and require this treatment.

=== 'Test and Treat' and HIV elimination ===
The United Nations (UN) initiative to help end the AIDS epidemic, "90-90-90" aims to get 90% of people with HIV knowing their HIV status, with 90% of these people on treatment, and 90% of those on treatment exhibiting viral suppression.

Fidler is co-principal investigator of the HPTN 071 (PopART) study, testing the impact of a combination HIV prevention package that includes a universal HIV test and treat strategy. Fidler stated that in 2017 that the HPTN071 (PopART) trials in Zambia and South Africa, where entire communities were offered voluntary HIV testing, and those testing positive were immediately referred for HIV treatment, had resulted in resulted in 90% of the population knowing their status, with 80% on treatment. The final statistic on those exhibiting viral suppression was not measured.

The idea behind our study was if most people living with HIV know their HIV status and take treatment, the risk of passing the virus on to their partners and children will be greatly reduced. The results show that this approach was successful –we hope the findings may help to reduce the number of new HIV infections across the world.

— Professor Sarah Fidler, study author.

The research team behind these trials was led by Fidler and Richard Hayes, Professor of Epidemiology and International Health at the London School of Hygiene & Tropical Medicine and was funded by the U.S. National Institutes of Health and the Bill and Melinda Gates Foundation among others.

Trials from 2013 to 2018 were conducted in 21 communities (of roughly 50,000 people in each) in Zambia and South Africa. This represents the largest ever HIV prevention trial yet, covering a total population of approximately 1 million people.

The findings published in the New England Journal of Medicine in 2019 showed that offering entire communities voluntary HIV testing, and immediately referring those who test positive for HIV treatment, could make a significant difference in controlling new HIV infections in southern Africa. New HIV infections were found to be 30% lower in communities where this intervention was introduced alongside offering other proven HIV prevention measures to those who tested negative, compared to communities that received standard care.

Speaking about the study's findings, Professor Hayes stated:

The primary results showed that the PopART universal testing-and-treatment intervention reduced the incidence of new infections – at population level – by about 20%.... At IAS 2019 [the biennial conference on HIV Science] the team reported the results of model projections showing that by the year 2030 new HIV infections each year will be 50-60% less if the PopART intervention is sustained. Costing results were also presented, showing that the annual cost of the service was $7 per person, and that the intervention was in the range regarded as cost-effective.These new findings show clearly that the PopART community-wide service for universal testing and treatment is feasible, acceptable and affordable. If sustained over time, this intervention has the potential to steeply reduce HIV incidence and contribute to global efforts to work towards HIV elimination by the year 2030.

== Selected publications ==
- Adherence to antiretroviral therapy in adolescents living with HIV: systematic review and meta-analysis (2014).
- Effect of Universal Testing and Treatment on HIV Incidence — HPTN 071 (PopART) (2019)
- Challenges of HIV diagnosis and management in the context of pre‐exposure prophylaxis (PrEP), post‐exposure prophylaxis (PEP), test and start and acute HIV infection: a scoping review (2019)
- Antiretroviral therapy alone versus antiretroviral therapy with a kick and kill approach, on measures of the HIV reservoir in participants with recent HIV infection (the RIVER trial): a phase 2, randomised trial (2020)
- Social response to the delivery of HIV self-testing in households: experiences from four Zambian HPTN 071 (PopART) urban communities (2020).

== Personal life ==
Fidler has worked part-time throughout her twenty-year career in order to give her the opportunity to spend time with her family.

Outside of work, Fidler has stated that she enjoys running, reading, loves music, travelling and spending time with her "three very patient and supportive grown-up children and [her] husband".

== See also ==
- Antiretroviral therapy (ART)
- The "Berlin Patient" (Timothy Ray Brown)
- The Mississippi baby
