= Canocapavir =

Clinical data
- Other names: ZM-H1505R

Legal status
- Legal status: investigational

Identifiers
- IUPAC name: (2R)-2-[1-(4-bromophenyl)-3-(4-fluorophenyl)pyrazol-4-yl]-3-[2-(2-oxo-1,3-dihydrobenzimidazol-5-yl)ethyl]-1,3-oxazolidin-4-one
- CAS Number: 2137847-19-7
- PubChem CID: 137477479
- DrugBank: DB21570
- ChemSpider: 128921743
- UNII: ITF8H4SZR1
- ChEBI: CHEBI:758676
- ChEMBL: ChEMBL5095093

Chemical and physical data
- Formula: C_{27}H_{21}BrFN_{5}O_{3}
- Molar mass: 562.399 g·mol^{−1}
- 3D model (JSmol): Interactive image
- SMILES: C1C(=O)N([C@H](O1)C2=CN(N=C2C3=CC=C(C=C3)F)C4=CC=C(C=C4)Br)CCC5=CC6=C(C=C5)NC(=O)N6
- InChI: InChI=InChI=1S/C27H21BrFN5O3/c28-18-4-8-20(9-5-18)34-14-21(25(32-34)17-2-6-19(29)7-3-17)26-33(24(35)15-37-26)12-11-16-1-10-22-23(13-16)31-27(36)30-22/h1-10,13-14,26H,11-12,15H2,(H2,30,31,36)/t26-/m1/s1; Key:YGPZZDKSASSELG-AREMUKBSSA-N

Canocapavir is an investigational new drug that is being evaluated by Zhimeng Biopharma for the treatment of Hepatitis B infections. It is an HBV capsid assembly inhibitor.

== Clinical trials ==
Phase 3 clinical trials of canocapavir for the treatment of chronic HBV infections are planned.

== See also ==
- Viral capsid inhibitor
