= 2F5 antibody =

Human monoclonal antibody

2F5 is a broadly neutralizing human monoclonal antibody (mAb) that has been shown to bind to and neutralize HIV-1 in vitro, making it a potential candidate for use in vaccine synthesis. 2F5 recognizes an epitope in the membrane-proximal external region (MPER) of HIV-1 gp41. 2F5 then binds to this epitope and its constant region interacts with the viral lipid membrane, which neutralizes the virus.

== Background ==
Human immunodeficiency virus type 1 (HIV-1) is the most common strain of HIV. It contains three structural genes and six regulatory genes. One of the structural genes is env, which codes for the surface proteins gp120 and gp41. Gp41, whose gene is the target for 2F5, is a transmembrane protein that associates with gp120 to bind the virus to CD4 and a chemokine co-receptor on the target cell and infect it. 2F5 binds to the variable regions of env and neutralizes the virus before it infects target cells.

== Epitope ==
2F5 recognizes a core specific epitope, ELDKWAS, the amino acid sequence from positions 662 to 668 of env gp41. Mutations at each of these amino acid positions of the epitope showed a decrease in or loss of 2F5 binding affinity. Further studies have expanded the ideal epitope beyond ELDKWAS and revealed that the extended linear epitope NEQELLELDKWASLWN increased 2F5 affinity greatly. The 3D structure of HIV-1 is believed to change throughout phases of the virus; 2F5 has highest binding affinity for its beginning and intermediate structures, and the least affinity for its late postfusion structure. The region DKW of the core epitope must be in a β-turn conformation and have the correct side-chain positions for 2F5 to bind and neutralize.

== Mechanism ==
Research has suggested that a two-step process is necessary for 2F5 binding and neutralizing: recognition of the epitope on gp41 and a hydrophobic interaction with the lipid membrane of the virus by the 2F5 CDR H3 loop. The structure of the antibody is such that it readily binds to a membrane-proximal epitope, unbothered by steric hindrance. It prevents infection by tightly binding to conserved structural regions and blocks membrane fusion by the HIV virus. 2F5 may also be able to activate the complement system and ADCC to kill infected cells.

== Vaccine implications ==
2F5 is not the only HIV-1-neutralizing antibody found; however, it is the broadest and prevents viral infection when transferred passively to macaques infected with chimeric simian-humans immunodeficiency virus (SHIV), making it a focus of research on development of an HIV-1 vaccine.

A major goal recently in HIV-1 vaccinations is eliciting the broadly neutralizing antibodies before the virus is actually established, since the virus integrates itself into the host's DNA. Vaccine trials have been largely unsuccessful in eliciting a response using mimics of the env region, potentially because of its high genetic variability.

The ELDKWAS sequence is conserved in 72% of HIV-1 isolates, which makes it a potentially good candidate for vaccination targets. When creating a vaccine, the isotype appears to matter: compared to IgG, the IgA isotype bound the epitope with higher affinity, blocked HIV transmission to target cells, and inhibited endocytosis of HIV-1 by dendritic cells, though it did have lower ADCC activity than IgG. Studies in thermodynamics have further supported this: IgG has a much higher binding affinity than just the Fab region of the antibody, suggesting the constant region is important to neutralization. This also indicates, as Fab is much smaller than IgG, that steric hindrance is not a problem for 2F5 and in fact may increase binding affinity. Besides the conformation of the linear epitope, 2F5-like responses to vaccine are complicated by the fact that antibody recognition of the epitope may also be dependent on interactions with other areas of the env region, accessibility, or interactions with membrane lipids on target cells.

== See also ==
- HIV vaccine
- Broadly neutralizing HIV-1 antibodies
