= Semzuvolimab =

Experimental antibody for HIV treatment

Semzuvolimab, formerly known as UB-421 is an experimental HIV antibody, under development by United Biomedical, Inc. (UBI), headquartered in Hauppauge, New York, U.S. for use in the treatment of HIV infection. By blocking the CDR2 domain of the CD4 receptor of the virus, it prevents initial viral attachment to the host T cell and entry into the host immune cell via a competitive inhibition mechanism. The antibody is unlikely to promote resistance to itself via generation of CD4-independent virus, and has performed well in phase 2 open-label trials. Additionally, it offers hope to HIV patients whose infection has become multi-drug resistant. Furthermore, the antibody has shown long term suppression, which requires the patient to be treated less often, which improves treatment adherence. Previous experimental infusions of broadly neutralizing antibodies (bNABs) have suppressed HIV for about two weeks by targeting proteins on the virus itself, but the rapid mutation rate of HIV induces antibody-resistant strains that render the treatment ineffective. UB-421 theoretically avoids this possibility by blocking a stable human protein that HIV uses to infect T cells. Its advantages include its competitive inhibition, a high affinity of UB-421 to CD4 T cells which is 100 times stronger than HIV, its neutralization of multiple sub-types of HIV, its inhibition of both cell-to-cell and cell-free transmission of HIV, and its immune modulation of training the immune system to better attack HIV, all of which provide potential as monotherapy.
