= Dolutegravir =

Chemical compound

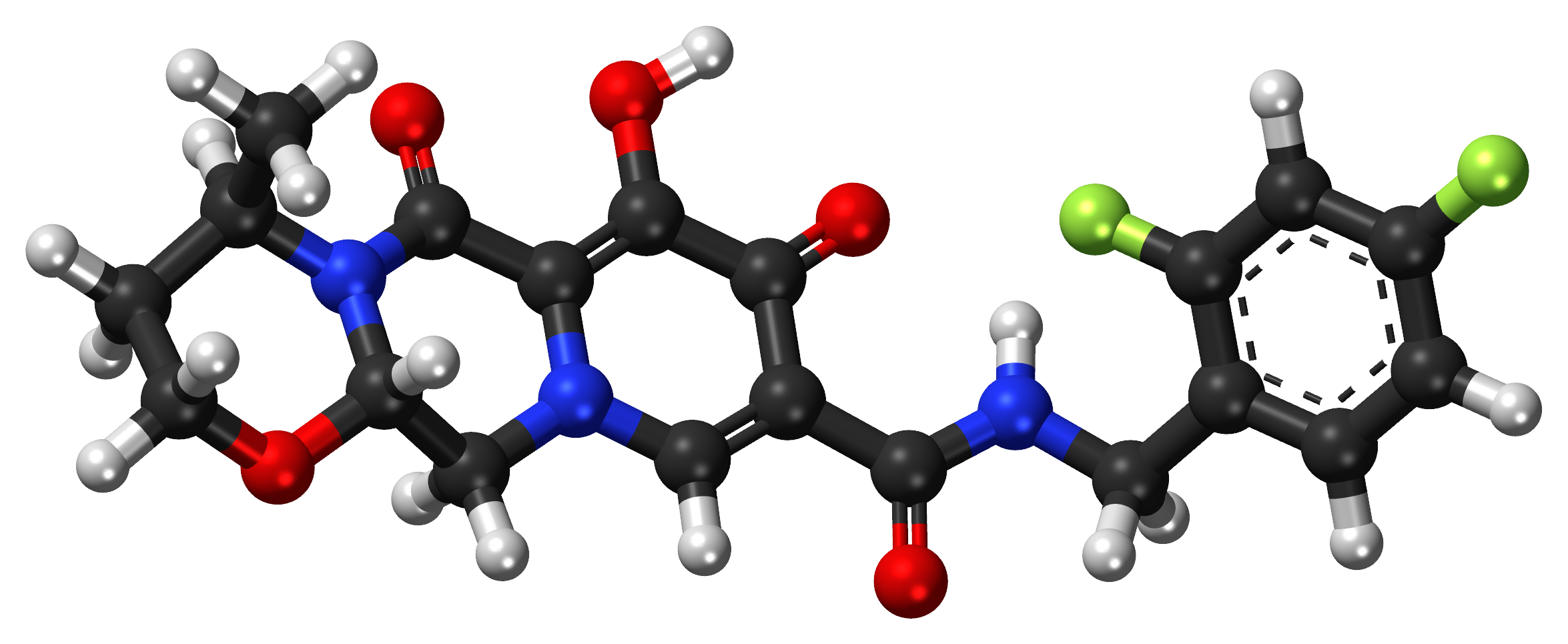

Clinical data
- Pronunciation: /ˌdoʊluːˈtɛɡrəvɪər/ DOH-loo-TEG-rə-veer
- Trade names: Tivicay, Tivicay PD, others
- Other names: DTG, GSK572, S-349572
- AHFS/Drugs.com: Monograph
- MedlinePlus: a613043
- License data: US DailyMed: Dolutegravir
- Pregnancy category: AU: B1
- Routes of administration: By mouth
- ATC code: J05AJ03 (WHO) J05AR13 (WHO) J05AR21 (WHO)

Legal status
- Legal status: AU: S4 (Prescription only); CA: ℞-only; UK: POM (Prescription only); US: ℞-only; EU: Rx-only; In general: ℞ (Prescription only)

Pharmacokinetic data
- Bioavailability: n/a
- Protein binding: ≥98.9%
- Metabolism: UGT1A1 and CYP3A
- Elimination half-life: ~14 hours
- Excretion: Feces (53%) and urine (18.9%)

Identifiers
- IUPAC name: (4R,12aS)-N-(2,4-difluorobenzyl)-7-hydroxy-4-methyl-6,8-dioxo-3,4,6,8,12,12a-hexahydro-2H-pyrido[1',2':4,5]pyrazino[2,1-b][1,3]oxazine-9-carboxamide
- CAS Number: 1051375-16-6
- PubChem CID: 54726191
- IUPHAR/BPS: 7365
- DrugBank: DB08930
- ChemSpider: 25051637
- UNII: DKO1W9H7M1
- KEGG: D10066
- ChEBI: CHEBI:76010
- ChEMBL: ChEMBL1229211
- PDB ligand: DLU (PDBe, RCSB PDB)
- CompTox Dashboard (EPA): DTXSID90909356
- ECHA InfoCard: 100.237.735

Chemical and physical data
- Formula: C_{20}H_{19}F_{2}N_{3}O_{5}
- Molar mass: 419.385 g·mol^{−1}
- 3D model (JSmol): Interactive image
- SMILES: C[C@@H]1CCO[C@@H]2N1C(=O)c3c(c(=O)c(cn3C2)C(=O)NCc4ccc(cc4F)F)O
- InChI: InChI=1S/C20H19F2N3O5/c1-10-4-5-30-15-9-24-8-13(17(26)18(27)16(24)20(29)25(10)15)19(28)23-7-11-2-3-12(21)6-14(11)22/h2-3,6,8,10,15,27H,4-5,7,9H2,1H3,(H,23,28)/t10-,15+/m1/s1; Key:RHWKPHLQXYSBKR-BMIGLBTASA-N

Dolutegravir, sold under the brand names Tivicay and Tivicay PD, is an antiretroviral medication used, together with other medication, to treat HIV/AIDS. It may also be used, as part of post exposure prophylaxis, to prevent HIV infection following potential exposure. It is taken by mouth.

Common side effects include trouble sleeping, feeling tired, diarrhea, high blood sugar, and headache. Severe side effects may include allergic reactions and liver problems. It is unclear if use during breastfeeding is safe. Dolutegravir is an HIV integrase strand transfer inhibitor which blocks the functioning of HIV integrase which is needed for viral replication.

Dolutegravir was approved for medical use in the United States in 2013. It is on the World Health Organization's List of Essential Medicines. Single tablet regimen combination drugs containing dolutegravir, such as dolutegravir/rilpivirine, dolutegravir/lamivudine, and abacavir/dolutegravir/lamivudine, are also available. As of 2019, the World Health Organization (WHO) recommends dolutegravir as the first- and second-line treatment for all persons with HIV.

== Medical use ==
In the United States, dolutegravir is indicated in combination with other antiretroviral agents for the treatment of HIV-1 infection in adults (treatment-naïve or -experienced) and in children (treatment-naïve or -experienced but integrase strand transferase inhibitor (INSTI)-naïve) weighing at least 2 kilograms (4.4 lb); or in combination with rilpivirine as a complete regimen for the treatment of HIV-1 infection in adults to replace the current antiretroviral regimen in those who are virologically suppressed (HIV-1 RNA less than 50 copies/mL) on a stable antiretroviral regimen for at least six months with no history of treatment failure or known substitutions associated with resistance to either antiretroviral agent.

Dolutegravir is approved for use in a broad population of HIV-infected patients. It can be used to treat HIV-infected adults who have never taken HIV therapy (treatment-naïve) and HIV-infected adults who have previously taken HIV therapy (treatment-experienced), including those who have been treated with other integrase strand transfer inhibitors. Tivicay is also approved for children ages 12 years and older weighing at least 40 kilograms (kg) who are treatment-naïve or treatment-experienced but have not previously taken other integrase strand transfer inhibitors.

In the European Union, dolutegravir is indicated, in combination with other antiretroviral medicinal products, for the treatment of HIV-infected adults, adolescents and children above six years of age and weighing at least 14 kilograms (31 lb); or in combination with other antiretroviral medicinal products for the treatment of HIV-infected adults, adolescents and children at least four weeks of age or older and weighing at least 3 kilograms (6.6 lb).

In June 2020, the indication for dolutegravir in the US was expanded to include children at least four weeks old and weighing at least 3 kg (6.61 pounds).

== Adverse effects ==
Common side effects of dolutegravir in clinical trials included insomnia and headache. Serious side effects included allergic reactions and abnormal liver function in patients who were also infected with hepatitis B or C. The package insert warns against a mean rise in serum creatinine of 0.11 mg/dL due to inhibition of tubular secretion of creatinine and does not affect renal function (GFR).

=== Pregnancy ===
Concerns that usage during pregnancy can result in harm to the baby have been refuted by studies that show there is no statistical difference in neural tube defects from the usage of dolutegravir compared with other antiretrovirals.

Dolutegravir is the US National Institutes of Health preferred antiretroviral drug for pregnant or non-pregnant people trying to conceive.

== History ==
In February 2013, the US Food and Drug Administration (FDA) announced that it would fast track dolutegravir's approval process. In August 2013, dolutegravir was approved for medical use in the United States. In November 2013, dolutegravir was approved by Health Canada. In January 2014, dolutegravir was authorized for medical use in the European Union.

In June 2020, dolutegravir was approved in the United States with an indication to treat HIV-1 infection in children at least four weeks old and weighing at least 3 kilograms (6.6 lb) in combination with other antiretroviral treatments. It is intended to treat children at least four weeks old and 3 kilograms (6.6 lb) who have never been treated for HIV or who have been treated, but not with an integrase strand transferase inhibitor (INSTI) class drug.

The US Food and Drug Administration (FDA) granted the approval of Tivicay and Tivicay PD to ViiV Healthcare.

=== Legal status ===
In April 2024, the government of Colombia issued its first ever compulsory license to invalidate the patent of Dolutegravir. Access to dolutegravir was enabled by a license to the Medicines Patent Pool however Colombia was not a listed territory. UNAIDS supported the move to enable a compulsory license decision. ViiV Healthcare disagreed with the decision on the use of the compulsory license by the government of Colombia. A separate agreement with the Medicines Patent Pool permits the distribution of generic versions of the medicine in Colombia, but it is restricted to children.

=== Climate change ===
Dolutegravir, used by 24 million people in low- and middle-income countries, has significantly reduced carbon emissions compared to the previous standard of care, efavirenz. This is the first report to analyze the environmental impact of a widely used medicine compared to its alternative. According to Unitaid, this transition will prevent over 26 million tons of CO_{2} from entering the atmosphere between 2017 and 2027, equivalent to eliminating 10 years of carbon emissions from Geneva, Switzerland.
