= Abacavir/dolutegravir/lamivudine =

Combination medication for HIV

Combination of
- Abacavir: nucleoside analog reverse transcriptase inhibitor
- Dolutegravir: integrase inhibitor
- Lamivudine: nucleoside analog reverse transcriptase inhibitor

Clinical data
- Trade names: Triumeq, Triumeq PD
- AHFS/Drugs.com: Monograph
- MedlinePlus: a617015
- License data: US DailyMed: Triumeq
- Pregnancy category: AU: B3
- Routes of administration: By mouth
- ATC code: J05AR13 (WHO)

Legal status
- Legal status: CA: ℞-only; US: ℞-only; EU: Rx-only; In general: ℞ (Prescription only)

Identifiers
- CAS Number: 1319715-09-7
- PubChem CID: 54736666
- ChemSpider: none
- KEGG: D10600

Abacavir/dolutegravir/lamivudine, sold under the brand name Triumeq among others, is a fixed-dose combination antiretroviral medication for the treatment of HIV/AIDS. It is a combination of three medications with different and complementary mechanisms of action: abacavir (reverse transcriptase inhibitor), dolutegravir (integrase inhibitor) and lamivudine (nucleoside analog reverse transcriptase inhibitor).

Abacavir is a nucleotide reverse transcriptase inhibitor. Specifically, abacavir is a guanosine analogue that interferes with HIV viral RNA-dependent DNA polymerase, ultimately resulting in inhibition of replication of HIV. Dolutegravir inhibits the HIV replication cycle by binding to the integrase active site and inhibiting the strand transfer step of HIV-1 DNA integration. Lamivudine is a cytosine analogue that inhibits HIV reverse transcription by terminating the viral DNA chain.

The medication was developed by ViiV Healthcare and was approved for use in the United States and in the European Union in 2014. The combination is on the World Health Organization's List of Essential Medicines.

== Medical uses ==
Abacavir/dolutegravir/lamivudine is indicated for the treatment of HIV/AIDS in people aged twelve years of age and older who weigh at least 40 kilograms (88 lb).

== Adverse effects ==
The US FDA prescription label contains a boxed warning of hypersensitivity reactions and exacerbations of hepatitis B.

The following adverse reactions were reported in <2% of patients:

- Central nervous system: drowsiness, lethargy, nightmares, sleep disorders, suicidal ideation
- Dermatologic: pruritus
- Endocrine and metabolic: high levels of triglycerides
- Gastrointestinal: abdominal distention, abdominal distress, abdominal pain, lack of appetite, stomach upset, flatulence, gastroesophageal reflux disease, upper abdominal pain, vomiting
- Hepatic: hepatitis
- Neuromuscular and skeletal: joint pain, muscle inflammation
- Kidney: chronic kidney disease
- Miscellaneous: fever

=== Pregnancy ===
Abacavir/dolutegravir/lamivudine should only be used in pregnancy if the potential benefits outweigh the risks.

=== Breastfeeding ===
The US Centers for Disease Control and Prevention (CDC) recommends that HIV-infected mothers do not breastfeed their infants to avoid risking postnatal transmission of HIV. This recommendation is coupled with the potential for serious adverse reactions in nursing infants. Lamivudine was shown to be excreted in human breast milk.

== History ==
The patent was filed in April 2006, and expires in October 2027.

== Society and culture ==
=== Legal status ===
The combination was approved for use in the United States and in the European Union in 2014.

=== Economics ===
A year supply of abacavir/dolutegravir/lamivudine costs around US$33,000 as it is under patent and not available as a generic.

In July 2015, ViiV Healthcare struck a deal with Shanghai-based Desano Pharmaceuticals for a cheaper supply of dolutegravir (Tivicay) with the goal of cutting the cost in China and other developing countries. After approval of dolutegravir (Tivicay) in 2014, it came with a retail cost of $14,000 per year in the United States.

== Research ==
=== Clinical trials ===
Efficacy of abacavir/dolutegravir/lamivudine was demonstrated in antiretroviral treatment-naive participants by SINGLE (ING114467), the randomized, controlled trial and other trials in treatment-naive subjects (see dolutegravir).

In the SINGLE trial, 414 participants received dolutegravir + abacavir/lamivudine once daily and 419 participants received efavirenz/emtricitabine/tenofovir once daily. dolutegravir + abacavir/lamivudine compared to efavirenz/emtricitabine/tenofovir showed a reduction in viral load of HIV-1 RNA <50 copies/mL in 80% of participants compared to 72% of participants, respectively. Furthermore, in participants with baseline plasma viral load of <100,000 and >100,000 copies/mL, dolutegravir + abacavir/lamivudine compared to efavirenz/emtricitabine/tenofovir showed a reduction to <50 copies/mL in 85% and 71% compared to 73% and 72%, respectively.

=== Post-marketing experience ===
In addition to the adverse reactions reported in clinical trials, the following adverse reactions have been reported voluntarily from a population of unknown size. As such, it is not always possible to estimate frequency or establish a causal relationship to drug exposure.

Abacavir and/or Lamivudine

- Digestive System: stomatitis
- Gastrointentional: pancreatitis
- General: weakness
- Blood and Lymphatic Systems: aplastic anemia, anemia, enlarged lymph nodes, enlarged spleen
- Hypersensitivity: sensitization reactions (including anaphylaxis), urticaria
- Metabolism and Nutrition Disorders: hyperprolactinemia
- Musculoskeletal System: muscle weakness, CPK elevation, rhabdomyolysis
- Nervous System: paresthesia, peripheral neuropathy, seizures
- Respiratory System: abnormal breath sounds/wheezing
- Skin: hair loss, erythema multiforme. Suspected Stevens–Johnson syndrome (SJS) and toxic epidermal necrolysis (TEN) have been reported in participants receiving abacavir primarily in combination with medications that are known to be associated with SJS and TEN, respectively.

=== Amyotrophic lateral sclerosis ===
The safety and tolerability of Triumeq was evaluated for amyotrophic lateral sclerosis (ALS) patients as part of the Lighthouse trial, an open-label, phase 2a study, conducted in Australia beginning in late 2016 over 24 weeks. The study premise was human endogenous retroviruses, specifically human endogenous retrovirus K (HERV-K) may be a trigger or cause of ALS. Research has linked HERV-K to ALS based on increased nonspecific reverse transcriptase activity in the cerebrospinal fluid and blood of ALS patients, as well as HERV-K being found in the motor neurons of ALS patients. Triumeq was chosen as all three component drugs have good penetration of the central nervous system, particularly dolutegravir, which has high clearance rates for CNS HIV. The study found a significant decrease in HERV-K DNA in serum among study participants and showed a decrease in the slope of clinical progression based on the Amyotrophic Lateral Sclerosis Functional Rating Scale-Revised (ALSFRS-R) of roughly 30%.
