= Neracorvir =

Clinical data
- Other names: GST-HG141

Legal status
- Legal status: investigational

Identifiers
- IUPAC name: N-[2-[(2S)-1,4-dioxan-2-yl]ethyl]-2-methyl-4,10,10-trioxo-5H-pyrrolo[1,2-b][1,2,5]benzothiadiazepine-7-carboxamide
- CAS Number: 2243162-66-3
- PubChem CID: 146416094
- DrugBank: DB21630
- ChemSpider: 114751798
- UNII: Y8Z4GA5NQH
- ChEBI: CHEBI:759178
- ChEMBL: ChEMBL5314472

Chemical and physical data
- Formula: C_{19}H_{21}N_{3}O_{6}S
- Molar mass: 419.45 g·mol^{−1}
- 3D model (JSmol): Interactive image
- SMILES: CC1=CN2C(=C1)C(=O)NC3=C(S2(=O)=O)C=CC(=C3)C(=O)NCC[C@H]4COCCO4
- InChI: InChI=InChI=1S/C19H21N3O6S/c1-12-8-16-19(24)21-15-9-13(2-3-17(15)29(25,26)22(16)10-12)18(23)20-5-4-14-11-27-6-7-28-14/h2-3,8-10,14H,4-7,11H2,1H3,(H,20,23)(H,21,24)/t14-/m0/s1; Key:OXJNOWPZKFUKNS-AWEZNQCLSA-N

Neracorvir is an investigational new drug that is being evaluated by Fujian Cosunter Pharmaceutical Company, Ltd. for the treatment of chronic hepatitis B virus (HBV) infections. It binds to the hepatitis B core (capsid) protein interfering with hepatitis B capsid assembly and viral replication. Neracorvir is sometimes referred to as a HBV core protein modulator, but in HBV, the core and capsid proteins are one in the same.

== Clinical trials ==
Neracorvir is currently in phase 3 clinical trials for chronic hepatitis B infection.

== See also ==
- Viral capsid inhibitor
