= AV-HALT =

AntiViral-HyperActivation Limiting Therapeutics (AV-HALTs) are an investigational class of antiretroviral drugs used to treat Human Immunodeficiency Virus (HIV) infection. Unlike other antiretroviral agents given to reduce viral replication, AV-HALTs are single or combination drugs designed to reduce the rate of viral replication while, at the same time, also directly reducing the state of immune system hyperactivation now believed to drive the loss of CD4+ T helper cells leading to disease progression and Acquired Immunodeficiency Syndrome (AIDS).

== Mechanism ==
Chronic immune stimulation due to persistent HIV replication and microbial translocation across impaired gut-associated lymphoid tissues (GALT) induces continuous T-cell activation and proliferation of both HIV-infected and bystander cells, ultimately resulting in the exhaustion of the immune system.

There is a growing recognition that successful long-term therapy for the treatment of HIV infection should not only reduce viral replication, but also limit the hyper-activation of the immune system now proposed as the cause of the eventual progression to AIDS. AV-HALTs are designed to accomplish two goals – the reduction of viral load (decreased viral load) and the reduction of immune system hyperactivation (decreased markers of cellular activation and proliferation). First generation AV-HALTs accomplish this by combining an antiviral drug (e.g. didanosine) with a cytostatic agent (e.g. hydroxyurea).

== Examples ==
- VS411, investigational first generation combination AV-HALT (low-dose hydroxyurea + didanosine) (Phase II) - ViroStatics, srl
- VS1-002, investigational second generation single-drug AV-HALT (Pre-clinical) - ViroStatics, srl

== Synonyms ==
- virostatics (antiVIRal + cytOSTATICS)
