= Dolutegravir/rilpivirine =

Antiretroviral medication

Combination of
- Dolutegravir: HIV integrase strand transfer inhibitor (INSTI)
- Rilpivirine: HIV non-nucleoside reverse-transcriptase inhibitor (NNRTI)

Clinical data
- Trade names: Juluca
- AHFS/Drugs.com: Monograph
- License data: US DailyMed: Juluca
- Pregnancy category: AU: B1
- Routes of administration: By mouth
- ATC code: J05AR21 (WHO)

Legal status
- Legal status: AU: S4 (Prescription only); CA: ℞-only; UK: POM (Prescription only); US: ℞-only; EU: Rx-only; In general: ℞ (Prescription only)

Identifiers
- KEGG: D11282

Dolutegravir/rilpivirine (DTG/RPV), sold under the brand name Juluca, is a fixed-dose combination antiretroviral medication for the treatment of HIV/AIDS. It contains the medicines dolutegravir and rilpivirine. It is taken orally (by mouth).

The most common adverse reactions (of all severity grades) are diarrhea and headache.

Dolutegravir/rilpivirine was approved for use in the United States in November 2017, and for use in the European Union in May 2018.

== Medical uses ==
Dolutegravir/rilpivirine is indicated for the treatment of human immunodeficiency virus type 1 (HIV-1) infection in adults who are virologically suppressed (HIV-1 RNA <50 copies/mL) on a stable antiretroviral regimen for at least six months with no history of virological failure and no known or suspected resistance to any non-nucleoside reverse transcriptase inhibitor or integrase inhibitor.
