= Mississippi baby =

American girl thought to be cured of HIV

- Born: September 2010 (age 15); Jackson, Mississippi, U.S.
- Known for: Thought to have been cured of HIV

The Mississippi baby (born 2010) is a Mississippi girl who in 2013 was thought to have been cured of HIV. She had contracted HIV at birth from her HIV-positive mother. Thirty hours after the baby was born, she was treated with intense antiretroviral therapy. When the baby was about 18 months old, the mother did not bring the child in for scheduled examinations for the next five months. When the mother returned with the child, doctors expected to find high levels of HIV, but instead the HIV levels were undetectable. The Mississippi baby was thought to be the other person, after the "Berlin patient," to have been cured of HIV. As a result, the National Institutes of Health planned to conduct a worldwide study on aggressive antiretroviral treatment of newborn infants of mothers with HIV infections. It was thought that aggressive antiretroviral therapy on newborn infants might be a cure for HIV. On July 10, 2014, however, it was reported that the child was found to be infected with HIV.

The worldwide study planned by the NIH continues in 2023 at 50 sites as clinical trial NCT02140255 under the same principal investigator.

== Background ==
In 2010, the "Mississippi baby" was a girl born by spontaneous vaginal delivery to an HIV infected mother at University of Mississippi Medical Center. The mother had received no prenatal care. During labor, the mother was tested for HIV and found to be positive. She gave birth to the baby before antiretroviral therapy could be delivered to prevent the transmission of HIV from the mother to the baby. When the baby was 30 hours old, Dr. Hannah Gay made the decision to begin aggressive antiretroviral therapy before the test results were available. The baby was tested for HIV at 30 and 31 hours of age and found to be infected.Antiretroviral therapy was continued and the baby was tested at 6, 11, and 19 days of age. All three tests were positive for HIV. At age 29 days, she was tested again and HIV levels were found to have dropped below detectable levels. During the girl's first year, she was not breast fed and adherence by the mother to the antiretroviral therapy was determined by examining pharmacy records and by HIV testing. During this time, adherence to the therapy regimen was determined to be adequate.

At 18 months of age, there was concern about adherence to the therapy regimen, but HIV levels remained below detectable levels. Between 18 and 23 months of age, the infant missed all clinical visits and the mother reported that she had stopped the antiretroviral therapy when the child was 18 months old—normally therapy would not have been stopped. The infant was tested and HIV levels were unexpectedly below detectable levels. Antiretroviral therapy was therefore not restarted.

The mother of the Mississippi baby tested positive for HIV 24 months after delivery. She began antiretroviral therapy 26 months after delivery and was still positive for HIV 28 months after delivery. As of July 2014, the child was 46 months old.

== Reported cure ==
In October 2013, the physicians in charge of the Mississippi baby's antiretroviral therapy reported that at 30 months, 12 months after antiretroviral therapy stopped, HIV levels in the child were found to be below detectable levels. They first reported these results at 2013 Conference on Retroviruses and Opportunistic Infections in Atlanta and subsequently published them in The New England Journal of Medicine. Tests showed that the HIV DNA was still present but at levels similar to those in the only other person thought to be "functionally" cured of HIV (i.e., "control of viral replication and lack of rebound once they come off antiretroviral medications"), the "Berlin patient".

Robert F. Siliciano hypothesized that the infant girl received antiretroviral therapy before producing memory T cells, which are immune cells that can serve as a viral reservoir for HIV. If treatment is received before they develop, there may be no place in the body for HIV to hide from antiretroviral drugs.

== HIV re-emergence ==
On July 10, 2014, at a news conference held at the National Institutes of Health, health experts announced that detectable levels of HIV had been found in the child in tests conducted a week earlier. In two separate tests, they found that her blood levels of HIV had gone from undetectable to 10,000 copies of HIV per milliliter. According to Anthony Fauci, director of the National Institute of Allergy and Infectious Diseases, this result "is a disappointing turn of events for this young child, the medical staff involved in the child's care and the HIV/AIDS research community". Hannah Gay told NPR that the re-emergence of the virus "felt very much like a punch to the gut". The Mississippi baby had been off her strong antiretroviral therapy for 27 months. Her HIV status was monitored every 6 to 8 weeks during that time with regular clinical visits.

After her HIV status was confirmed by testing, she was placed back on antiretroviral therapy. By July 10, there were clinical indications that the therapy was working and reducing her viral load.

== Analysis ==
If a mother is known to have HIV, she is given antiretroviral therapy during her pregnancy, which reduces the transmission of HIV to her baby to less than 2 percent (if a mother is untreated, transmission rates range from 15 to 45 percent). Although it is not common in the United States, some mothers do not know their HIV status and are not treated with antiretroviral therapy during pregnancy. In 2011, 127 babies were born HIV positive in the United States, but an estimated 330,000 babies per year are infected at birth by HIV around the world.

Before the news of the re-emergence of the virus in the Mississippi baby, the National Institutes of Health had planned to conduct a worldwide study (using 17 hospitals in the US and hospitals in 11 other countries) of 54 infants that tested positive for HIV and to treat them with aggressive antiretroviral therapy within 48 hours after birth. If the infants subsequently had undetectable levels of HIV, the therapy would be stopped at 24 months. They would then be monitored for at least five years to see whether detectable levels of HIV re-emerged, as with HIV patients who stop taking their drugs. The study also planned to include two groups: infants breast fed by mothers who are receiving antiretroviral therapy and babies fed only infant formula. Fauci stated that the planned study would likely continue, but modifications would be made. In particular, it is ethically unclear whether antiretroviral therapy should be stopped after 24 months to see whether viral loads rebound. George J. Annas told NPR that he did not think that this aspect of the proposed study would pass "ethical muster".

As a result of the re-occurrence of the virus in the Mississippi baby, researchers are now asking whether fragments of the virus, which were still detectable, managed to recombine into a whole virus, or whether the virus managed to hide somewhere in the body that rendered it undetectable in testing. One hypothesis had been that babies might be born without viral reservoirs in which the virus could hide. Anthony Fauci told USA Today that it had long been hypothesized that a cure for HIV was possible "if you can get somebody treated before the reservoir of virus forms in the body, and before the immune system has been damaged by months or years of viral replication." For instance, healthcare workers exposed to HIV immediately receive therapy, which almost always prevents infection by HIV.

Nevertheless, Deborah Persaud told USA Today that

The fact that this child was able to remain off anti-retroviral treatment for two years and maintain quiescent virus for that length of time is unprecedented. Typically, when treatment is stopped, HIV levels rebound within weeks, not years.

Sarah Fidler of Imperial College London believes, despite the Mississippi baby setback, that early treatment could prevent the virus from taking hold. Babies born of untreated HIV mothers become infected during the first hours of birth, and Fidler believes that effective treatment may have to begin within this brief window; this would require having antiretroviral drugs immediately available at the time of birth.

== Related cases ==
There is a second baby infected with HIV in California who received antiretroviral therapy four hours after birth. The baby will not be taken off antiretroviral drugs to determine whether she is cured for ethical reasons. As of July 2014, the baby was in foster care because her mother was in an advanced stage of AIDS.
