= Dolutegravir/lamivudine =

Combination drug

Combination of
- Dolutegravir: Integrase inhibitor
- Lamivudine: Reverse-transcriptase inhibitor

Clinical data
- Trade names: Dovato
- AHFS/Drugs.com: Monograph
- MedlinePlus: a619043
- License data: US DailyMed: Dolutegravir and lamivudine
- Pregnancy category: AU: B3
- Routes of administration: By mouth
- ATC code: J05AR25 (WHO)

Legal status
- Legal status: AU: S4 (Prescription only); CA: ℞-only; UK: POM (Prescription only); US: ℞-only; EU: Rx-only; In general: ℞ (Prescription only)

Identifiers
- CAS Number: 2446159-49-3
- KEGG: D11522

Dolutegravir/lamivudine, sold under the brand name Dovato, is a fixed-dose combination antiretroviral medication for the treatment of HIV/AIDS. each pill contains 50 mg dolutegravir, as the salt, an integrase strand transfer inhibitor (INSTI), and 300 mg lamivudine, a nucleoside analogue reverse transcriptase inhibitor (NRTI). It is taken by mouth.

It was approved for use in the United States in April 2019, and in the European Union in July 2019, and again with revisions in June 2022.

The most common side effects are headache, diarrhea, nausea, and difficulty sleeping. The most common serious side effects are allergic reactions, including rash and severe liver problems.

Dolutegravir/lamivudine is the first FDA-approved two-drug, fixed-dose, complete regimen for HIV-infected adults who have never received treatment for HIV.

== Medical uses ==
In the EU, dolutegravir/lamivudine is indicated for the treatment of human immunodeficiency virus type 1 (HIV-1) infection in adults and adolescents above 12 years of age weighing at least 40 kilograms (88 lb), with no known or suspected resistance to the integrase inhibitor class, or lamivudine.

In the US, it is indicated as a complete regimen for the treatment of human immunodeficiency virus type 1 (HIV-1) infection in adults.

== History ==
The efficacy and safety of dolutegravir/lamivudine were demonstrated in two identical, randomized, double-blind, controlled clinical trials in 1,433 HIV-infected adults with no prior antiretroviral treatment history. The trials showed that a drug regimen containing dolutegravir and lamivudine had a similar effect of reducing the amount of HIV in the blood compared to another drug regimen, which included dolutegravir, emtricitabine, and tenofovir. The treatment was considered successful if the participant maintained low-levels (less than 50 copies/mL) of HIV RNA in their blood for at least 48 weeks. In these studies, 91% of subjects with HIV-1 who took the dolutegravir/lamivudine combination no longer had detectable levels of HIV (i.e. they had fewer than 50 copies per ml) after 48 weeks compared with 93% of those who were taking the triple combination. In neither study was there a case of resistance to treatment after 48 weeks.
