= Broadly neutralizing HIV-1 antibodies =

Broadly neutralizing HIV-1 antibodies (bNAbs) are neutralizing antibodies (NAbs) which neutralize multiple HIV-1 viral strains. bNAbs are unique in that they target conserved epitopes of the virus, meaning the virus may mutate, but the targeted epitopes will still exist. In contrast, non-bNAbs are specific for individual viral strains with unique epitopes; the vast majority of NAbs are non-bNAbs.

bNAbs arise very rarely, through many rounds of affinity maturation against related versions of an antigen. One ideal in the field of vaccination is to reliably replicate this process so as to immunize against a broad spectrum of related pathogens such as HIV and influenza.

== Mechanism of emergence ==
The immune system generates new antibodies through the diversity mechanism of B-cell receptors (BCRs) and antibodies, which have their heavy chains nearly randomly assembled from several versions of variable regions and joined using error-prone pathways that generate even more variability. B cells expressing BCRs are activated when the randomly-generated immunoglobulin binds an antigen, causing them to divide rapidly with high rates of mutation (somatic hypermutation), which leads to sub-lineages that are differently activated due to differences in their antigen-binding abilities. The lineages expressing better-binding antibodies/BCRs will outcompete the less-activated ones due to receiving more signal for growth. This selection process is called affinity maturation and requires the help of T helper cells. Activated B cells also differentiate into antibody-releasing plasma cells and memory B cells (a BCR is the membrane-bound form of an antibody); this too requires T helper cells.

Affinity maturation in the germinal center (GC) does not happen just once. In ongoing or repeated exposures to antigens, B cells may enter the GC multiple times and become re-matured. If the antigen changes slightly (for example via mutation of the virus), this process can effectively "edit" the antibody to bind the new version better.

In a very small minority of cases, the starting combination of variable chains leads to an antibody that is well-poised to target a conserved part of the antigen, a part that is rarely altered during mutation. With many rounds of affinity maturation against variants of an antigen, the resulting antibody may become adept at binding all these variants of this antigen by targeting that conserved epitope: a bNAb.

== Characteristics ==
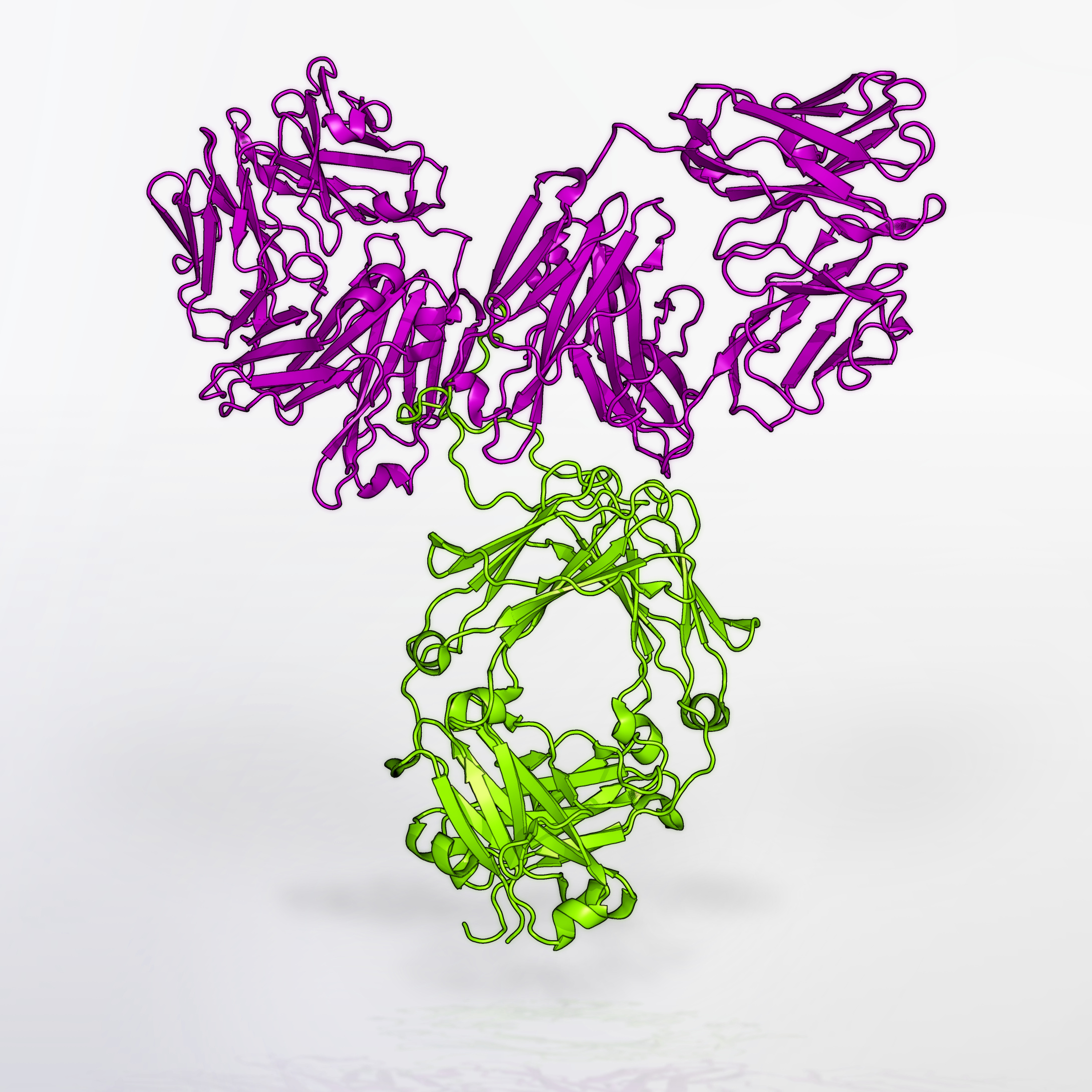
Model of the VRC01 antibody

The following table shows the characteristics of various HIV-1 bNAbs

Viral epitope	Antibody binding characteristics	Antibody clonal family	Year published
MPER of gp41	Contiguous sequence	2F5	1992
	Contiguous sequence	4E10	1994
	Contiguous sequence	M66.6	2011
	Contiguous sequence	CAP206-CH12	2011
	Contiguous sequence	10E8 l	2012
V1V2-glycan	Peptidoglycan	PG9, PG16	2009
	Peptidoglycan	CH01–04	2011
	Peptidoglycan	PGT 141–145	2011
Outer domain glycan	Glycan only	2G12	1994
V3-glycan	Peptidoglycan	PGT121–123	2011
	Peptidoglycan	PGT125–131	2011
	Peptidoglycan	PGT135–137	2011
CD4 binding site	CDRH3 loop	b12	1991
	CDRH3 loop	HJ16	2010
	CDRH3 loop	CH103–106	2013
	Mimics CD4 via CDRH2	VRC01–03	2010
	Mimics CD4 via CDRH2	VRC-PG04, 04b	2011
	Mimics CD4 via CDRH2	VRC-CH30–34	2011
	Mimics CD4 via CDRH2	3BNC117, 3BNC60	2011
	Mimics CD4 via CDRH2	NIH45–46	2011
	Mimics CD4 via CDRH2	12A12, 12A21	2011
	Mimics CD4 via CDRH2	8ANC131, 134	2011, 2015
	Mimics CD4 via CDRH2	1NC9, 1B2530	2011, 2015

In addition to targeting conserved epitopes, bNAbs are known to have long variable regions on their immunoglobulin (Ig) isotypes and subclasses. When compared to non-bNAbs, sequence variability from the germline immunoglobulin isotype is 7 fold. This implies that bNAbs develop from intense affinity maturation in the germinal centers hence the reason for high sequence variability on the variable Ig domain. Indeed HIV-1 patients who develop bNAbs have been shown to have high germinal center activity as exhibited by their comparatively higher levels of plasma CXCL13, which is a biomarker of germinal center activity.

Online databases like bNAber (now defunct) and LANL constantly report and update the discovery of new HIV bNAbs.

== History of HIV bNAbs ==
In 1990, researchers identified the first HIV bNAb, far more powerful than any antibody seen before. They described the exact viral component, or epitope that triggered the antibody. Six amino acids at the tip of HIV's surface protein, gp120, were responsible. The first bNAb turned out to be clinically irrelevant, but in 1994 another team isolated a bNAb that worked on cells taken from patients. This antibody attached to a "conserved" portion of gp120 that outlasts many of its mutations, affecting 17/24 tested strains at low doses. Another bNAb was discovered that acted on protein gp41 across many strains. Antibodies require antigens to trigger them and these were not originally identified.

Over time more bNAbs were isolated, while single cell antibody cloning made it possible to produce large quantities of the antibodies for study. Low levels of bNAbs are now found in up to 25% of HIV patients. bNAbs evolve over years, accumulating some three times as many mutations as other antibodies.

By 2006, researchers had identified a few so-called "broadly neutralizing antibodies" (bNAbs) that worked on multiple HIV strains. They analyzed 1800 blood samples from HIV-infected people from Africa, South Asia and the English-speaking world. They individually probed 30,000 of one woman's antibody-producing B cells and isolated two that were able to stop more than 70% of 162 divergent HIV strains from establishing an infection. Since 2009, researchers have identified more than 50 HIV bNAbs.

In 2006, a Malawian man joined a study within weeks of becoming infected. Over a year, he repeatedly donated blood, which researchers used to create a timeline of changes in his virus' gp120, his antibody response and the ultimate emergence of a bNAb. Researchers want to direct this evolution in other subjects to achieve similar results. A screen of massive gp120 libraries led to one that strongly bound both an original antibody and the mature bNAb that evolved from it. Giving patients a modified gp120 that contains little more than the epitope that both antibodies target could act to "prime" the immune system, followed by a booster that contains trimer spikes in the most natural configuration possible. However, it is still under study whether bNAbs could prevent HIV infection.

In 2009, researchers isolated and characterized the first HIV bNAbs seen in a decade. The two broadest neutralizers were PGT151 and PGT152. They could block about two-thirds of a large panel of HIV strains. Unlike most other bNAbs, these antibodies do not bind to known epitopes, on Env or on Env's subunits (gp120 or gp41). Instead, they attach to parts of both. Gp120 and gp41 assemble as a trimer. The bNAbs binding site occurs only on the trimer structure, the form of Env that invades host cells.

Recent years have seen an increase in HIV-1 bNAb discovery.

== See also ==
- HIV vaccine development
- UB-421
