= Lenacapavir =

Antiretroviral medication

- Molecular structure of lenacapavir

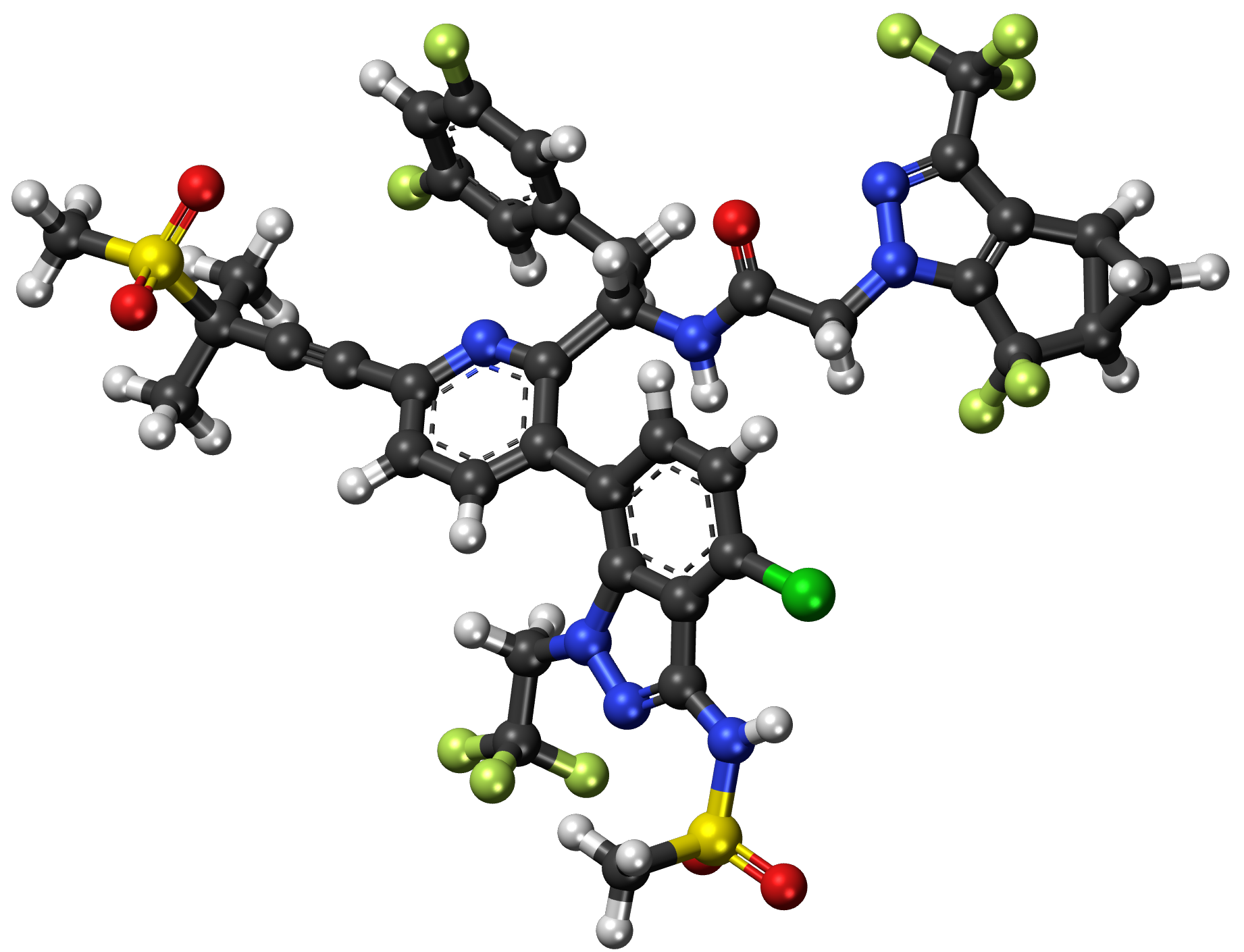
- 3D representation of a lenacapavir molecule

Clinical data
- Pronunciation: /ˌlɛnəˈkæpəvɪər/ LEN-ə-KAP-ə-veer
- Trade names: Sunlenca, Yeztugo, others
- Other names: GS-CA2, GS-6207
- AHFS/Drugs.com: Monograph
- MedlinePlus: a623005
- License data: US DailyMed: Lenacapavir
- Pregnancy category: AU: B1
- Routes of administration: By mouth, subcutaneous
- Drug class: Capsid inhibitors
- ATC code: J05AX31 (WHO)

Legal status
- Legal status: AU: S4 (Prescription only); CA: ℞-only; US: ℞-only; EU: Rx-only

Identifiers
- IUPAC name: N-[(1S)-1-{3-[4-chloro-3-(methanesulfonamido)-1-(2,2,2-trifluoroethyl)-1H-indazol-7-yl]-6-[3-(methanesulfonyl)-3-methylbut-1-yn-1-yl]pyridin-2-yl}-2-(3,5-difluorophenyl)ethyl]-2-[(3bS,4aR)-5,5-difluoro-3-(trifluoromethyl)-3b,4,4a,5-tetrahydro-1H-cyclopropa[3,4]cyclopenta[1,2-c]pyrazol-1-yl]acetamide
- CAS Number: 2189684-44-2
- DrugBank: DB15673
- ChemSpider: 81367881
- UNII: A9A0O6FB4H
- KEGG: D12161; D12162
- ChEMBL: ChEMBL4594438
- PDB ligand: QNG (PDBe, RCSB PDB)

Chemical and physical data
- Formula: C_{39}H_{32}ClF_{10}N_{7}O_{5}S_{2}
- Molar mass: 968.28 g·mol^{−1}
- 3D model (JSmol): Interactive image
- SMILES: CC(C#CC1=NC([C@@H](NC(CN2N=C(C3=C2C(F)([C@@H]4C[C@H]34)F)C(F)(F)F)=O)CC5=CC(F)=CC(F)=C5)=C(C6=CC=C(C7=C6N(CC(F)(F)F)N=C7NS(C)(=O)=O)Cl)C=C1)(S(C)(=O)=O)C
- InChI: InChI=1S/C39H32ClF10N7O5S2/c1-36(2,63(3,59)60)10-9-21-5-6-22(23-7-8-26(40)30-32(23)57(17-37(43,44)45)54-35(30)55-64(4,61)62)31(51-21)27(13-18-11-19(41)14-20(42)12-18)52-28(58)16-56-34-29(33(53-56)39(48,49)50)24-15-25(24)38(34,46)47/h5-8,11-12,14,24-25,27H,13,15-17H2,1-4H3,(H,52,58)(H,54,55)/t24-,25+,27-/m0/s1; Key:BRYXUCLEHAUSDY-WEWMWRJBSA-N

Lenacapavir, sold under the brand names Sunlenca among others, is an antiretroviral medication used to treat and prevent HIV/AIDS. It is taken by mouth or by subcutaneous injection. Lenacapavir is a human immunodeficiency virus type 1 (HIV-1) capsid inhibitor. It is given by mouth and as a subcutaneous injection.

The most common side effects include reactions at the injection site and nausea.

Lenacapavir was first authorized for medical use in the European Union in August 2022, in Canada in November 2022, and in the United States in December 2022. It is the first of a class of drugs called capsid inhibitors to be approved by the US Food and Drug Administration (FDA) for treating HIV/AIDS. The FDA considers it to be a first-in-class medication.

In 2025, lenacapavir was approved for HIV prevention (PrEP) in the United States, the European Union, and Canada and introduced in China. In 2026, it became available for PrEP as Yeytuo in Australia. India has sought a waiver to bring faster approval for its use as PrEP in the country based on existing evidence, and Indian generic manufacturers have entered into a voluntary licensing agreement with Gilead Sciences to make the medication available at low cost to high priority countries in a "global access strategy".

== Medical uses ==
Lenacapavir (as Sunlenca) in combination with other antiretrovirals, is indicated for the treatment of HIV/AIDS. It is used in heavily treatment-experienced adults with multiple drug resistance in whom existing antiretroviral therapy is ineffective due to resistance, intolerance or safety considerations.

Lenacapavir (as Yeztugo or Yeytuo), is indicated for pre-exposure prophylaxis for HIV prevention to reduce the risk of sexually acquired HIV-1 in adults and adolescents weighing more than 35 kilograms (77 lb) who are at risk for HIV-1 acquisition.

== Mechanism of action ==
Lenacapavir works by binding directly to the interface between HIV-1 viral capsid protein (p24) subunits in capsid hexamers, interfering with essential steps of viral replication, including capsid-mediated nuclear uptake of HIV-1 proviral DNA (it over-stabilizes the capsid, preventing it from properly releasing its contents), virus assembly and release, production of capsid protein subunits, and capsid core formation.

Because lenacapavir is the first medication that targets the p24 capsid, mutations that confer resistance to other antiretrovirals have no effect on lenacapavir. However, mutations of the capsid can still confer resistance, especially when the drug is used without an "optimized background therapy" (a combination of existing drugs used alongside a new or experimental medication to treat drug-resistant infections).

Due to the fact that lenacapavir is a highly potent medication with a long tissue half-life, therapeutic drug levels can be maintained with twice-yearly subcutaneous injections.

== History ==
Lenacapavir was developed by Gilead Sciences.

The safety and efficacy of lenacapavir were established through a multi-center clinical trial with 72 participants whose HIV infections were resistant to multiple classes of HIV medications. These participants had to have high levels of virus in their blood despite being on antiretroviral drugs. Participants were enrolled into one of two study groups. One group was randomized to receive either lenacapavir or placebo in a double-blind fashion, and the other group received open-label lenacapavir. The primary measure of efficacy was the proportion of participants in the randomized study group who achieved a certain level of reduction in virus during the initial 14 days compared to baseline.

The US Food and Drug Administration granted the application for lenacapavir priority review, fast track, and breakthrough therapy designations. Lenacapavir was approved for medical use in the United States in December 2022.

In 2024, lenacapavir was named the "2024 Breakthrough of the Year", citing its "astonishing 100% efficacy" in one large efficacy trial in women to prevent HIV and "99.9% efficacy in gender diverse people who have sex with men," while highlighting that research providing a "new understanding of the structure and function of HIV's capsid protein" led to the drug's "off-the-charts success".

== Society and culture ==
=== Legal status ===
In June 2022, the Committee for Medicinal Products for Human Use (CHMP) of the European Medicines Agency adopted a positive opinion, recommending the granting of a marketing authorization for the medicinal product Sunlenca, intended for the treatment of adults with multidrug‑resistant human immunodeficiency virus type 1 (HIV‑1) infection. The applicant for this medicinal product is Gilead Sciences Ireland UC.

Lenacapavir was authorized for medical use in the European Union in August 2022, in Canada in November 2022, and in the United States in December 2022.

In February 2025, the US Food and Drug Administration (FDA) accepted Gilead Sciences's drug application for twice-yearly lenacapavir under priority review. The FDA approved lenacapavir (as Yeztugo) for HIV prevention in June 2025.

In July 2025, the CHMP adopted a positive opinion recommending the granting of a marketing authorization for lenacapavir for the prophylaxis against sexually acquired human immunodeficiency virus type 1 (HIV-1) infection. It was authorized for medical use in the European Union in September 2025.

=== Economics ===
As of 2024 the medication, produced by Gilead Sciences, costs US$42,250 for the first year. A study presented in July 2024 found that mass production of a generic version would allow a profit margin of 30% on an annual price of $40 if used by 10 million people. The authors said that lowering world HIV levels significantly would probably require 60 million people to take the drug preventatively.

Gilead Sciences set the list price for Yeztugo at $28,218 in 2025.

In September 2025, partnerships led by the Clinton Health Access Initiative, Unitaid, and the Gates Foundation secured agreements with Indian manufacturers to provide lenacapavir for HIV prevention at US$40 per patient annually in 120 low- and middle-income countries. The first doses of the drug arrived in Zambia and Eswatini later in 2025 with US and Gilead support, though some advocacy groups criticized the Trump administration for trying to take credit after it "decimated" U.S. global AIDS programs.

== Research ==
Studies have been conducted for the use of lenacapavir in treatment-naive individuals. For virally suppressed individuals switching treatment, early studies have tested lenacapavir injections in combination with infusions of the broadly neutralizing antibodies teropavimab and zinlirvimab as well as lenacapavir with islatravir.

A phase III clinical trial study examined efficacy for pre-exposure HIV prevention (PrEP). It found an incidence rate ratio of 0.00 (as no cases occurred in the lenacapavir group) with a 95% confidence interval of 0.00–0.04 with p<.001. Injection site reactions led to discontinuation by 0.2% of lenacapavir patients.

Another lenacapavir phase III study, examined the incidence compared to the background rate for men. It found an incidence rate ratio of 0.04 with a 95% confidence interval of 0.01 to 0.18, at p<.001. Injection site reactions led to discontinuation by 1.2% of patients.

Lenacapavir has been found to be effective as HIV pre-exposure prophylaxis (PrEP) in heterosexual women in Africa.
