= Management of HIV/AIDS =

Gap to reaching the target of ART

The management of HIV/AIDS normally includes the use of multiple antiretroviral drugs as a strategy to control HIV infection. There are several classes of antiretroviral agents that act on different stages of the replication cycle of HIV. The use of multiple drugs that act on different viral targets is known as highly active antiretroviral therapy (HAART). HAART decreases the patient's total burden of HIV, maintains function of the immune system, and prevents opportunistic infections that often lead to death. HAART also prevents the transmission of HIV between serodiscordant same-sex and opposite-sex partners so long as the HIV-positive partner maintains an undetectable viral load.

Treatment has been so successful that in many parts of the world, HIV has become a chronic condition in which progression to AIDS is increasingly rare. Anthony Fauci, former head of the United States National Institute of Allergy and Infectious Diseases, has written, "With collective and resolute action now and a steadfast commitment for years to come, an AIDS-free generation is indeed within reach." In the same paper, he noted that an estimated 700,000 lives were saved in 2010 alone by antiretroviral therapy. As another commentary noted, "Rather than dealing with acute and potentially life-threatening complications, clinicians are now confronted with managing a chronic disease that in the absence of a cure will persist for many decades."

The United States Department of Health and Human Services and the World Health Organization (WHO) recommend offering antiretroviral treatment to all patients with HIV. Because of the complexity of selecting and following a regimen, the potential for side effects, and the importance of taking medications regularly to prevent viral resistance, such organizations emphasize the importance of involving patients in therapy choices and recommend analyzing the risks and the potential benefits.

The WHO has defined health as more than the absence of disease. For this reason, many researchers have dedicated their work to better understanding the effects of HIV-related stigma, the barriers it creates for treatment interventions, and the ways in which those barriers can be circumvented.

== Classes of medication ==
Schematic description of the mechanism of the four classes of available antiretroviral drugs against HIV

Antiretroviral (ARV) drugs are medications that are used to prevent and treat infection by retroviruses, most commonly HIV.

Antiretroviral drugs are broadly classified by the phase of the replication cycle of HIV inhibited by the drug. There are six classes of antiretroviral drugs, which are usually used in combination. Typical combinations include two nucleoside reverse-transcriptase inhibitors (NRTI) as a "backbone" along with one non-nucleoside reverse-transcriptase inhibitor (NNRTI), protease inhibitor (PI) or integrase inhibitors (also known as integrase nuclear strand transfer inhibitors or INSTIs) as a "base".

In Addition, HIV-1 capsid which is finely regulated and plays critical roles throughout the HIV life cycle, recently emerged as a promising target for Anti-viral drugs.

=== Entry inhibitors ===
Entry inhibitors (or fusion inhibitors) interfere with binding, fusion and entry of HIV-1 to the host cell by blocking one of several targets. Maraviroc, enfuvirtide and Ibalizumab are available agents in this class. Maraviroc works by targeting CCR5, a co-receptor located on human helper T-cells. Caution should be used when administering this drug, however, due to a possible shift in tropism which allows HIV to target an alternative co-receptor such as CXCR4. Ibalizumab is effective against both CCR5 and CXCR4 tropic HIV viruses.

In rare cases, individuals may have a mutation in the CCR5 delta gene which results in a nonfunctional CCR5 co-receptor and in turn, a means of resistance or slow progression of the disease. However, as mentioned previously, this can be overcome if an HIV variant that targets CXCR4 becomes dominant. To prevent fusion of the virus with the host membrane, enfuvirtide can be used. Enfuvirtide is a peptide drug that must be injected and acts by interacting with the N-terminal heptad repeat of gp41 of HIV to form an inactive hetero six-helix bundle, therefore preventing infection of host cells.

=== Nucleoside/nucleotide reverse-transcriptase inhibitors ===
Nucleoside reverse-transcriptase inhibitors (NRTI) and nucleotide reverse-transcriptase inhibitors (NtRTI) are nucleoside and nucleotide analogues which inhibit reverse transcription. HIV is an RNA virus, so it can not be integrated into the DNA in the nucleus of the human cell unless it is first "reverse" transcribed into DNA. Since the conversion of RNA to DNA is not naturally done in the mammalian cell, it is performed by a viral protein, reverse transcriptase, which makes it a selective target for inhibition. NRTIs are chain terminators. Once NRTIs are incorporated into the DNA chain, their lack of a 3' OH group prevents the subsequent incorporation of other nucleosides. Both NRTIs and NtRTIs act as competitive substrate inhibitors. Examples of NRTIs include zidovudine, abacavir, lamivudine, emtricitabine, and of NtRTIs – tenofovir and adefovir.

=== Non-nucleoside reverse-transcriptase inhibitors ===
Non-nucleoside reverse-transcriptase inhibitors (NNRTI) inhibit reverse transcriptase by binding to an allosteric site of the enzyme; NNRTIs act as non-competitive inhibitors of reverse transcriptase. NNRTIs affect the handling of substrate (nucleotides) by reverse transcriptase by binding near the active site. NNRTIs can be further classified into 1st generation and 2nd generation NNRTIs. 1st generation NNRTIs include nevirapine and efavirenz. 2nd generation NNRTIs are etravirine and rilpivirine. HIV-2 is intrinsically resistant to NNRTIs.

=== Integrase inhibitors ===
Integrase inhibitors (also known as integrase nuclear strand transfer inhibitors or INSTIs) inhibit the viral enzyme integrase, which is responsible for integration of viral DNA into the DNA of the infected cell. There are several integrase inhibitors under clinical trial, and raltegravir became the first to receive FDA approval in October 2007. Raltegravir has two metal binding groups that compete for substrate with two Mg^{2+} ions at the metal binding site of integrase. As of early 2022, four other clinically approved integrase inhibitors are elvitegravir, dolutegravir, bictegravir, and cabotegravir.

=== Protease inhibitors ===
Protease inhibitors block the viral protease enzyme necessary to produce mature virions upon budding from the host membrane. Particularly, these drugs prevent the cleavage of gag and gag/pol precursor proteins. Virus particles produced in the presence of protease inhibitors are defective and mostly non-infectious. Examples of HIV protease inhibitors are lopinavir, indinavir, nelfinavir, amprenavir and ritonavir. Darunavir and atazanavir are recommended as first line therapy choices. Maturation inhibitors have a similar effect by binding to gag, but development of two experimental drugs in this class, bevirimat and vivecon, was halted in 2010. Resistance to some protease inhibitors is high. Second generation drugs have been developed that are effective against otherwise resistant HIV variants.

=== Capsid inhibitors ===
HIV capsid inhibition targets the structural capsid protein (CA) shell, which plays a central role for the intertwined processes essential for replication accelerated tackling some of the challenges of anti-viral drugs with a novel class of drugs called capsid inhibitors. GS-6207 Lenacapavir is a first in class ultra potent and long acting HIV-1 capsid inhibitor that recently gained approval from European Union and US Food and Drug Administration for the treatment of multi drug resistant HIV-1 infection. Lenacapavir is a long acting injectable medication administered subcutaneously every 6 months, and it shows unprecedented efficacy in pre-exposure prophylaxis for HIV treatment.

== Combination therapy ==
The life cycle of HIV can be as short as about 1.5 days from viral entry into a cell, through replication, assembly, and release of additional viruses, to infection of other cells. HIV lacks proofreading enzymes to correct errors made when it converts its RNA into DNA via reverse transcription. Its short life-cycle and high error rate cause the virus to mutate very rapidly, resulting in a high genetic variability. Most of the mutations either are inferior to the parent virus (often lacking the ability to reproduce at all) or convey no advantage, but some of them have a natural selection superiority to their parent and can enable them to slip past defenses such as the human immune system and antiretroviral drugs. The more active copies of the virus, the greater the possibility that one resistant to antiretroviral drugs will be made.

When antiretroviral drugs are used improperly, multi-drug resistant strains can become the dominant genotypes very rapidly. In the era before multiple drug classes were available (pre-1997), the reverse-transcriptase inhibitors zidovudine, didanosine, zalcitabine, stavudine, and lamivudine were used serially or in combination leading to the development of multi-drug resistant mutations.

In contrast, antiretroviral combination therapy defends against resistance by creating multiple obstacles to HIV replication. This keeps the number of viral copies low and reduces the possibility of a superior mutation. If a mutation that conveys resistance to one of the drugs arises, the other drugs continue to suppress reproduction of that mutation. With rare exceptions, no individual antiretroviral drug has been demonstrated to suppress an HIV infection for long; these agents must be taken in combinations in order to have a lasting effect. As a result, the standard of care is to use combinations of antiretroviral drugs. Combinations usually consist of three drugs from at least two different classes. This three drug combination is commonly known as a triple cocktail. Combinations of antiretrovirals are subject to positive and negative synergies, which limits the number of useful combinations.

Because of HIV's tendency to mutate, when patients who have started an antiretrovial regimen fail to take it regularly, resistance can develop. On the other hand, patients who take their medications regularly can stay on one regimen without developing resistance. This greatly increases life expectancy and leaves more drugs available to the individual should the need arise.

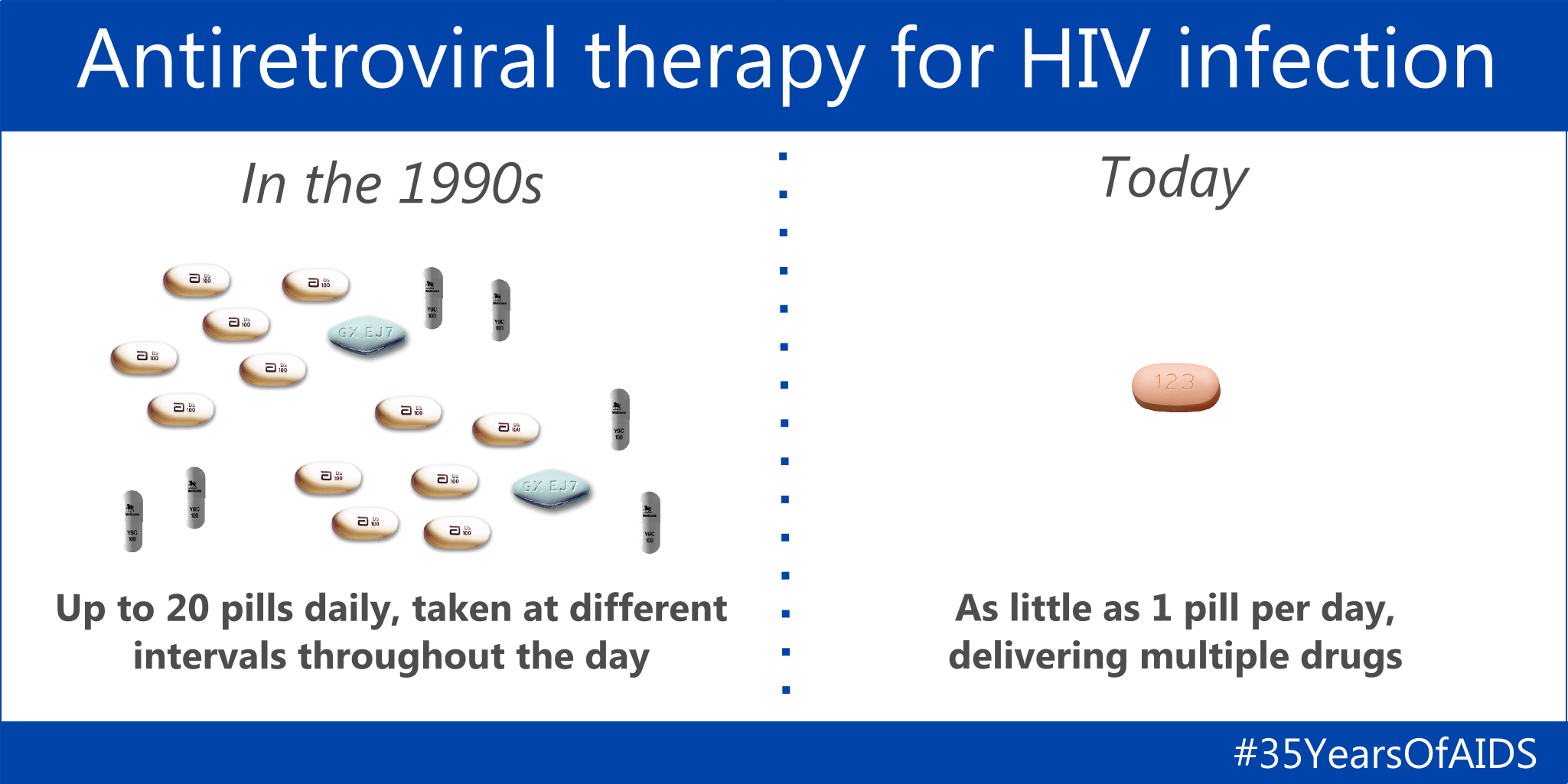
A 2016 advertisement from NIAID promoting the advancement of single-pill antiretroviral drug combinations

In 2000, drug companies have worked together to combine these complex regimens into single-pill fixed-dose combinations. More than 20 antiretroviral fixed-dose combinations have been developed. This greatly increases the ease with which they can be taken, which in turn increases the consistency with which medication is taken (adherence), and thus their effectiveness over the long-term.

=== Adjunct treatment ===
Although antiretroviral therapy has helped to improve the quality of life of people living with HIV, there is still a need to explore other ways to further address the disease burden. One such potential strategy that was investigated was to add interleukin 2 as an adjunct to antiretroviral therapy for adults with HIV. A Cochrane review included 25 randomized controlled trials that were conducted across six countries. The researchers found that interleukin 2 increases the CD4 immune cells, but does not make a difference in terms of death and incidence of other infections. Furthermore, there is probably an increase in side-effects with interleukin 2. The findings of this review do not support the use of interleukin 2 as an add-on treatment to antiretroviral therapy for adults with HIV.

== Treatment guidelines ==
=== Initiation of antiretroviral therapy ===
Antiretroviral drug treatment guidelines have changed over time. Before 1987, no antiretroviral drugs were available and treatment consisted of treating complications from opportunistic infections and malignancies. After antiretroviral medications were introduced, most clinicians agreed that HIV positive patients with low CD4 counts should be treated, but no consensus formed as to whether to treat patients with high CD4 counts.

In April 1995, Merck and the National Institute of Allergy and Infectious Diseases began recruiting patients for a trial examining the effects of a three drug combination of the protease inhibitor indinavir and two nucleoside analogs, illustrating the substantial benefit of combining two NRTIs with a new class of antiretrovirals, protease inhibitors, namely indinavir. Later that year David Ho became an advocate of this "hit hard, hit early" approach with aggressive treatment with multiple antiretrovirals early in the course of the infection. Later reviews in the late 90s and early 2000s noted that this approach of "hit hard, hit early" ran significant risks of increasing side effects and development of multidrug resistance, and this approach was largely abandoned. The only consensus was on treating patients with advanced immunosuppression (CD4 counts less than 350/μL). Treatment with antiretrovirals was expensive at the time, ranging from $10,000 to $15,000 a year.

The timing of when to start therapy has continued to be a core controversy within the medical community, though recent studies have led to more clarity. The NA-ACCORD study observed patients who started antiretroviral therapy either at a CD4 count of less than 500 versus less than 350 and showed that patients who started ART at lower CD4 counts had a 69% increase in the risk of death. In 2015 the START and TEMPRANO studies both showed that patients lived longer if they started antiretrovirals at the time of their diagnosis, rather than waiting for their CD4 counts to drop to a specified level.

Other arguments for starting therapy earlier are that people who start therapy later have been shown to have less recovery of their immune systems, and higher CD4 counts are associated with less cancer.

The European Medicines Agency (EMA) has recommended the granting of marketing authorizations for two new antiretroviral (ARV) medicines, rilpivirine (Rekambys) and cabotegravir (Vocabria), to be used together for the treatment of people with human immunodeficiency virus type 1 (HIV-1) infection. The two medicines are the first ARVs that come in a long-acting injectable formulation. This means that instead of daily pills, people receive intramuscular injections monthly or every two months.

The combination of Rekambys and Vocabria injection is intended for maintenance treatment of adults who have undetectable HIV levels in the blood (viral load less than 50 copies/ml) with their current ARV treatment, and when the virus has not developed resistance to certain class of anti-HIV medicines called non-nucleoside reverse transcriptase inhibitors (NNRTIs) and integrase strand transfer inhibitors (INIs).

==== Treatment as prevention ====
A separate argument for starting antiretroviral therapy that has gained more prominence is its effect on HIV transmission. ART reduces the amount of virus in the blood and genital secretions. This has been shown to lead to dramatically reduced transmission of HIV when one partner with a suppressed viral load (<50 copies/ml) has sex with a partner who is HIV negative. In clinical trial HPTN 052, 1763 serodiscordant heterosexual couples in nine countries were planned to be followed for at least 10 years, with both groups receiving education on preventing HIV transmission and condoms, but only one group getting ART. The study was stopped early (after 1.7 years) for ethical reasons when it became clear that antiviral treatment provided significant protection. Of the 28 couples where cross-infection had occurred, all but one had taken place in the control group, consistent with a 96% reduction in risk of transmission while on ART. The single transmission in the experimental group occurred early after starting ART before viral load was likely to be suppressed. Pre-exposure prophylaxis (PrEP) provides HIV-negative individuals with medication—in conjunction with safer-sex education and regular HIV/STI screenings—in order to reduce the risk of acquiring HIV. In 2011, the journal Science gave the Breakthrough of the Year award to treatment as prevention.

In July 2016 a consensus document was created by the Prevention Access Campaign which has been endorsed by over 400 organisations in 58 countries. The consensus document states that the risk of HIV transmission from a person living with HIV who has been undetectable for a minimum of six months is negligible to non-existent, with negligible being defined as "so small or unimportant to be not worth considering". The Chair of the British HIV Association (BHIVA), Chloe Orkin, stated in July 2017 that 'there should be no doubt about the clear and simple message that a person with sustained, undetectable levels of HIV virus in their blood cannot transmit HIV to their sexual partners.'

Furthermore, the PARTNER study, which ran from 2010 to 2014, enrolled 1166 serodiscordant couples (where one partner is HIV positive and the other is negative) in a study that found that the estimated rate of transmission through any condomless sex with the HIV-positive partner taking ART with an HIV load less than 200 copies/ml was zero.

In summary, as the WHO HIV treatment guidelines state, "The ARV regimens now available, even in the poorest countries, are safer, simpler, more effective and more affordable than ever before."

There is a consensus among experts that, once initiated, antiretroviral therapy should never be stopped. This is because the selection pressure of incomplete suppression of viral replication in the presence of drug therapy causes the more drug sensitive strains to be selectively inhibited. This allows the drug resistant strains to become dominant. This in turn makes it harder to treat the infected individual as well as anyone else they infect. One trial showed higher rates of opportunistic infections, cancers, heart attacks and death in patients who periodically interrupted their ART.

=== Guideline sources ===
There are several treatment guidelines for HIV-1 infected adults in the developed world (that is, those countries with access to all or most therapies and laboratory tests). In the United States there are both the International AIDS Society-USA (IAS-USA) (a 501(c)(3) not-for-profit organization in the US) as well as the US government's Department of Health and Human Services guidelines. In Europe there are the European AIDS Clinical Society guidelines.

For resource limited countries, most national guidelines closely follow the World Health Organization (WHO) guidelines.

==== Guidelines ====
The guidelines use new criteria to consider starting HAART, as described below. However, there remain a range of views on this subject and the decision of whether to commence treatment ultimately rests with the patient and his or her doctor.

The US DHHS guidelines (published April 8, 2015) state:

- Antiretroviral therapy (ART) is recommended for all HIV-infected individuals to reduce the risk of disease progression.
- ART also is recommended for HIV-infected individuals for the prevention of transmission of HIV.
- Patients starting ART should be willing and able to commit to treatment and understand the benefits and risks of therapy and the importance of adherence. Patients may choose to postpone therapy, and providers, on a case-by-case basis, may elect to defer therapy on the basis of clinical and/or psychosocial factors.

The newest WHO guidelines (dated September 30, 2015) now agree and state:

- Antiretroviral therapy (ART) should be initiated in everyone living with HIV at any CD4 cell count

==== Baseline resistance ====
Baseline resistance is the presence of resistance mutations in patients who have never been treated before for HIV. In countries with a high rate of baseline resistance, resistance testing is recommended before starting treatment; or, if the initiation of treatment is urgent, then a "best guess" treatment regimen should be started, which is then modified on the basis of resistance testing. In the UK, there is 11.8% medium to high-level resistance at baseline to the combination of efavirenz + zidovudine + lamivudine, and 6.4% medium to high level resistance to stavudine + lamivudine + nevirapine. In the US, 10.8% of one cohort of patients who had never been on ART before had at least one resistance mutation in 2005. Various surveys in different parts of the world have shown increasing or stable rates of baseline resistance as the era of effective HIV therapy continues. With baseline resistance testing, a combination of antiretrovirals that are likely to be effective can be customized for each patient.

=== Regimens ===
Most HAART regimens consist of three drugs: Two NRTIs ("backbone")+ a PI/NNRTI/INSTI ("base"). Initial regimens use "first-line" drugs with a high efficacy and low side-effect profile.

The US DHHS preferred initial regimens for adults and adolescents in the United States, as of late 2024, are:

- bictegravir/emtricitabine/tenofovir alafenamide (BIC/FTC/TAF)
- dolutegravir (DTG) plus tenofovir disoproxil (TDF) or tenofovir alafenamide (TAF) plus emtricitabine (FTC) or lamivudine (3TC)
- dolutegravir/lamivudine (DTG/3TC) (Note: Not recommended in individuals with HIV RNA >500,000 copies/mL, Hepatitis B virus coinfection, or in whom ART is to be started before the results of HIV genotypic resistance testing for reverse transcriptase or HBV testing are available.)
- darunavir/cobicistat (DRV/c) or darunavir/ritonavir (DRV/r) with tenofovir disoproxil (TDF) or tenofovir alafenamide (TAF) plus emtricitabine (FTC) or lamivudine (3TC) (Note: Recommended regimen if ART is to be started before results of genotypic resistance testing are available.)

Previous DHHS guidelines (as of April 2015) recommended the following regimens:

- tenofovir/emtricitabine and raltegravir (an integrase inhibitor)
- tenofovir/emtricitabine and dolutegravir (an integrase inhibitor)
- dolutegravir/abacavir/lamivudine for patients who have been tested negative for the HLA-B*5701 gene allele
- tenofovir/emtricitabine/elvitegravir/cobicistat in patients with good kidney function (GFR > 70)
- tenofovir/emtricitabine, ritonavir, and darunavir (both latter are protease inhibitors)

Both efavirenz and nevirapine showed similar benefits when combined with NRTI respectively.

In the case of the protease inhibitor based regimens, ritonavir is used at low doses to inhibit cytochrome p450 enzymes and "boost" the levels of other protease inhibitors, rather than for its direct antiviral effect. This boosting effect allows them to be taken less frequently throughout the day. Cobicistat is used with elvitegravir for a similar effect but does not have any direct antiviral effect itself.

The WHO preferred initial regimens for adults and adolescents as of 24 December 2025 are:

- Tenofovir (TDF or TAF) + lamivudine (3TC) or emtricitabine (FTC) + dolutegravir (DTG)
- Tenofovir (TDF) + lamivudine (3TC) + efavirenz (EFV) 400mg (Note: Alternative initial regimen.)

The WHO recommendations were updated in 2019 to recommend a first-line regimen consisting of dolutegravir in combination with an NRTI backbone. WHO guidelines in 2013 had a preferred initial regimen consisting of:

- tenofovir + lamivudine (or emtricitabine) + efavirenz

=== Special populations ===
==== Acute infection ====
In the first six months after infection HIV viral loads tend to be elevated and people are more often symptomatic than in later latent phases of HIV disease. There may be special benefits to starting antiretroviral therapy early during this acute phase, including lowering the viral "set-point" or baseline viral load, reduce the mutation rate of the virus, and reduce the size of the viral reservoir (See section below on viral reservoirs). The SPARTAC trial compared 48 weeks of ART vs 12 weeks vs no treatment in acute HIV infection and found that 48 weeks of treatment delayed the time to decline in CD4 count below 350 cells per ml by 65 weeks and kept viral loads significantly lower even after treatment was stopped.

Since viral loads are usually very high during acute infection, this period carries an estimated 26 times higher risk of transmission. By treating acutely infected patients, it is presumed that it could have a significant impact on decreasing overall HIV transmission rates since lower viral loads are associated with lower risk of transmission (See section on treatment as prevention). However an overall benefit has not been proven and has to be balanced with the risks of HIV treatment. Therapy during acute infection carries a grade BII recommendation from the US DHHS.

==== Children ====
HIV can be especially harmful to infants and children, with one study in Africa showing that 52% of untreated children born with HIV had died by age 2. By five years old, the risk of disease and death from HIV starts to approach that of young adults. The WHO recommends treating all children less than 5 years old, and starting all children older than 5 with stage 3 or 4 disease or CD4 <500 cells/ml. DHHS guidelines are more complicated but recommend starting all children less than 12 months old and children of any age who have symptoms.

As for which antiretrovirals to use, this is complicated by the fact that many children who are born to mothers with HIV are given a single dose of nevirapine (an NNRTI) at the time of birth to prevent transmission. If this fails it can lead to NNRTI resistance. Also, a large study in Africa and India found that a PI based regimen was superior to an NNRTI based regimen in children less than 3 years who had never been exposed to NNRTIs in the past. Thus the WHO recommends PI based regimens for children less than 3.

As of 2025, the WHO recommends the following initial regimens for neonates:

- abacavir (ABC) + lamivudine (3TC) + dolutegravir (DTG) (Note: Dosed at 5mg every other day for the first two weeks of life, then increased to 5mg every day.)
- zidovudine (AZT) + lamivudine (3TC) + nevirapine (NVP)

As of 2025, the WHO recommends the following initial regimens for children:

- abacavir (ABC) + lamivudine (3TC) + dolutegravir (DTG)
- tenofovir alafenamide (TAF) + lamivudine (3TC) or emtricitabine (FTC) + dolutegravir (DTG)
- abacavir (ABC) + lamivudine (3TC) + darunavir/ritonavir (DRV/r) or atazanavir/ritonavir (ATV/r) or lopinavir/ritonavir (LPV/r)

US DHHS guidelines as of 2026 identify the following regimens as preferred for infants aged less than 30 days:

- dolutegravir (DTG) plus zidovudine (ZDV) plus lamivudine (3TC) or emtricitabine (FTC)
- nevapirine plus zidovudine (ZDV) plus lamivudine (3TC) or emtricitabine (FTC) (Note: Preferred regimen for preterm infants ≥32 to <37 weeks of gestation.)

US DHHS guidelines as of 2026 identify the following regimens as preferred for infants and children aged 30 days old to 2 years old:

- dolutegravir (DTG) plus zidovudine (ZDV) plus lamivudine (3TC) or emtricitabine (FTC)
- dolutegravir (DTG) plus abacavir (ABC) plus lamivudine (3TC) or emtricitabine (FTC) (Note: If HLA-B*5701 negative)
- dolutegravir/abacavir/lamivudine (DTG/ABC/3TG) as a fixed-dose combination

US DHHS guidelines as of 2026 identify the following regimens as preferred for children aged 2 years old to 12 years old:

- bictegravir/emtricitabine/tenofovir alafenamide (BIC/FTC/TAF)
- dolutegravir/abacavir/lamivudine (DTG/ABC/3TG) as a fixed-dose combination (Note: Also recommended if child is unable to swallow pills.)
- dolutegravir (DTG) plus emtricitabine/tenofovir alafenamide (FTC/TAF) as a fixed-dose combination
- dolutegravir (DTG) plus zidovudine (ZDV) plus lamivudine (3TC) or emtricitabine (FTC) (Note: Only recommended if child is unable to swallow pills.)

A systematic review assessed the effects and safety of abacavir-containing regimens as first-line therapy for children between 1 month and 18 years of age when compared to regimens with other NRTIs. This review included two trials and two observational studies with almost eleven thousand HIV infected children and adolescents. They measured virologic suppression, death and adverse events. The authors found that there is no meaningful difference between abacavir-containing regimens and other NRTI-containing regimens. The evidence is of low to moderate quality and therefore it is likely that future research may change these findings.

==== Pregnant women ====
The goals of treatment for pregnant women include the same benefits to the mother as in other infected adults as well as prevention of transmission to her child. The risk of transmission from mother to child is proportional to the plasma viral load of the mother. Untreated mothers with a viral load >100,000 copies/ml have a transmission risk of over 50%. The risk when viral loads are < 1000 copies/ml are less than 1%. ART for mothers both before and during delivery and to mothers and infants after delivery are recommended to substantially reduce the risk of transmission. The mode of delivery is also important, with a planned Caesarian section having a lower risk than vaginal delivery or emergency Caesarian section.

HIV can also be detected in breast milk of infected mothers and transmitted through breast feeding. The WHO balances the low risk of transmission through breast feeding from women who are on ART with the benefits of breastfeeding against diarrhea, pneumonia and malnutrition. It also strongly recommends that breastfeeding infants receive prophylactic ART. In the US, the DHHS recommends against women with HIV breastfeeding.

==== Older adults ====
With improvements in HIV therapy, several studies now estimate that patients on treatment in high-income countries can expect a normal life expectancy. This means that a higher proportion of people living with HIV are now older and research is ongoing into the unique aspects of HIV infection in the older adult. There is data that older people with HIV have a blunted CD4 response to therapy but are more likely to achieve undetectable viral levels. However, not all studies have seen a difference in response to therapy. The guidelines do not have separate treatment recommendations for older adults, but it is important to take into account that older patients are more likely to be on multiple non-HIV medications and consider drug interactions with any potential HIV medications. There are also increased rates of HIV associated non-AIDS conditions (HANA) such as heart disease, liver disease and dementia that are multifactorial complications from HIV, associated behaviors, coinfections like hepatitis B, hepatitis C, and human papilloma virus (HPV) as well as HIV treatment.

==== Adults with depression ====
Many factors may contribute to depression in adults living with HIV, such as the effects of the virus on the brain, other infections or tumours, antiretroviral drugs and other medical treatment. Rates of major depression are higher in people living with HIV compared to the general population, and this may negatively influence antiretroviral treatment. In a systematic review, Cochrane researchers assessed whether giving antidepressants to adults living with both HIV and depression may improve depression. Ten trials, of which eight were done in high-income countries, with 709 participants were included. Results indicated that antidepressants may be better in improving depression compared to placebo, but the quality of the evidence is low and future research is likely to impact on the findings.

== Concerns ==
There are several concerns about antiretroviral regimens that should be addressed before initiating:

- Intolerance: The drugs can have serious side-effects which can lead to harm as well as keep patients from taking their medications regularly.
- Resistance: Not taking medication consistently can lead to low blood levels that foster drug resistance.
- Cost: The WHO maintains a database of world ART costs which have dropped dramatically in recent years as more first line drugs have gone off-patent. A one pill, once a day combination therapy has been introduced in South Africa for as little as $10 per patient per month. One 2013 study estimated an overall cost savings to ART therapy in South Africa given reduced transmission. In the United States, new on-patent regimens can cost up to $28,500 per patient, per year.
- Public health: Individuals who fail to use antiretrovirals as directed can develop multi-drug resistant strains which can be passed onto others.

== Response to therapy ==
=== Virologic response ===
Suppressing the viral load to undetectable levels (<50 copies per ml) is the primary goal of ART. This should happen by 24 weeks after starting combination therapy. Viral load monitoring is the most important predictor of response to treatment with ART. Lack of viral load suppression on ART is termed virologic failure. Levels higher than 200 copies per ml is considered virologic failure, and should prompt further testing for potential viral resistance.

Research has shown that people with an undetectable viral load are unable to transmit the virus through condomless sex with a partner of either gender. The 'Swiss Statement' of 2008 described the chance of transmission as 'very low' or 'negligible,' but multiple studies have since shown that this mode of sexual transmission is impossible where the HIV-positive person has a consistently undetectable viral load. This discovery has led to the formation of the Prevention Access Campaign are their 'U=U' or 'Undetectable=Untransmittable' public information strategy, an approach that has gained widespread support amongst HIV/AIDS-related medical, charitable, and research organisations. The studies demonstrating that U=U is an effective strategy for preventing HIV transmission in serodiscordant couples so long as "the partner living with HIV [has] a durably suppressed viral load" include: Opposites Attract, PARTNER 1, PARTNER 2, (for male–male couples) and HPTN052 (for heterosexual couples). In these studies, couples where one partner was HIV-positive and one partner was HIV-negative were enrolled and regular HIV testing completed. In total from the four studies, 4097 couples were enrolled over four continents and 151,880 acts of condomless sex were reported, there were zero phylogenetically linked transmissions of HIV where the positive partner had an undetectable viral load. Following this the U=U consensus statement advocating the use of 'zero risk' was signed by hundreds of individuals and organisations including the US CDC, British HIV Association and The Lancet medical journal. The importance of the final results of the PARTNER 2 study were described by the medical director of the Terrence Higgins Trust as "impossible to overstate", while lead author Alison Rodger declared that the message that "undetectable viral load makes HIV untransmittable ... can help end the HIV pandemic by preventing HIV transmission." The authors summarised their findings in The Lancet as follows:

Our results provide a similar level of evidence on viral suppression and HIV transmission risk for gay men to that previously generated for heterosexual couples and suggest that the risk of HIV transmission in gay couples through condomless sex when HIV viral load is suppressed is effectively zero. Our findings support the message of the U=U (undetectable equals untransmittable) campaign, and the benefits of early testing and treatment for HIV.

This result is consistent with the conclusion presented by Anthony S. Fauci, the Director of the National Institute of Allergy and Infectious Diseases for the U.S. National Institutes of Health, and his team in a viewpoint published in the Journal of the American Medical Association, that U=U is an effective HIV prevention method when an undetectable viral load is maintained.

=== Immunologic response ===
CD4 cell counts are another key measure of immune status and ART effectiveness. CD4 counts should rise 50 to 100 cells per ml in the first year of therapy. There can be substantial fluctuation in CD4 counts of up to 25% based on the time of day or concomitant infections. In one long-term study, the majority of increase in CD4 cell counts was in the first two years after starting ART with little increase afterwards. This study also found that patients who began ART at lower CD4 counts continued to have lower CD4 counts than those who started at higher CD4 counts. When viral suppression on ART is achieved but without a corresponding increase in CD4 counts it can be termed immunologic nonresponse or immunologic failure. While this is predictive of worse outcomes, there is no consensus on how to adjust therapy to immunologic failure and whether switching therapy is beneficial. DHHS guidelines do not recommend switching an otherwise suppressive regimen.

Innate lymphoid cells (ILC) are another class of immune cell that is depleted during HIV infection. However, if ART is initiated before this depletion at around 7 days post infection, ILC levels can be maintained. While CD4 cell counts typically replenish after effective ART, ILCs depletion is irreversible with ART initiated after the depletion despite suppression of viremia. Since one of the roles of ILCs is to regulate the immune response to commensal bacteria and to maintain an effective gut barrier, it has been hypothesized that the irreversible depletion of ILCs plays a role in the weakened gut barrier of HIV patients, even after successful ART.

== Salvage therapy ==
In patients who have persistently detectable viral loads while taking ART, tests can be done to investigate whether there is drug resistance. Most commonly a genotype is sequenced which can be compared with databases of other HIV viral genotypes and resistance profiles to predict response to therapy. Resistance testing may improve virological outcomes in those who have treatment failures. However, there is lack of evidence of effectiveness of such testing in those who have not done any treatment before.

If there is extensive resistance a phenotypic test of a patient's virus against a range of drug concentrations can be performed, but is expensive and can take several weeks, so genotypes are generally preferred. Using information from a genotype or phenotype, a regimen of three drugs from at least two classes is constructed that will have the highest probability of suppressing the virus. If a regimen cannot be constructed from recommended first line agents it is termed salvage therapy, and when six or more drugs are needed it is termed mega-HAART.

== Structured treatment interruptions ==
Drug holidays (or "structured treatment interruptions") are intentional discontinuations of antiretroviral drug treatment. As mentioned above, randomized controlled studies of structured treatment interruptions have shown higher rates of opportunistic infections, cancers, heart attacks and death in patients who took drug holidays. With the exception of post-exposure prophylaxis (PEP), treatment guidelines do not call for the interruption of drug therapy once it has been initiated.

== Adverse effects ==
Each class and individual antiretroviral carries unique risks of adverse side effects.

=== NRTIs ===
The NRTIs can interfere with mitochondrial DNA synthesis and lead to high levels of lactate and lactic acidosis, liver steatosis, peripheral neuropathy, myopathy and lipoatrophy. First-line NRTIs such as lamivudine/emtrictabine, tenofovir, and abacavir are less likely to cause mitochondrial dysfunction.

Mitochondrial Haplogroups(mtDNA), non pathologic mutations inherited from the maternal line, have been linked to the efficacy of CD4+ count following ART. Idiosyncratic toxicity with mtDNA haplogroup is also well studied (Boeisteril et al., 2007).

=== NNRTIs ===
NNRTIs are generally safe and well tolerated. The main reason for discontinuation of efavirenz is neuro-psychiatric effects including suicidal ideation. Nevirapine can cause severe hepatotoxicity, especially in women with high CD4 counts.

=== Protease inhibitors ===
Protease inhibitors (PIs) are often given with ritonavir, a strong inhibitor of cytochrome P450 enzymes, leading to numerous drug-drug interactions. They are also associated with lipodystrophy, elevated triglycerides and elevated risk of heart attack.

=== Integrase inhibitors ===
Integrase inhibitors (INSTIs) are among the best tolerated of the antiretrovirals with excellent short and medium term outcomes. Given their relatively new development there is less long term safety data. They are associated with an increase in creatinine kinase levels and rarely myopathy.

== Post-exposure prophylaxis (PEP) ==
When people are exposed to HIV-positive infectious bodily fluids either through skin puncture, contact with mucous membranes or contact with damaged skin, they are at risk for acquiring HIV. Pooled estimates give a risk of transmission with puncture exposures of 0.3% and mucous membrane exposures 0.63%. United States guidelines state that "feces, nasal secretions, saliva, sputum, sweat, tears, urine, and vomitus are not considered potentially infectious unless they are visibly bloody." Given the rare nature of these events, rigorous study of the protective abilities of antiretrovirals are limited but do suggest that taking antiretrovirals afterwards can prevent transmission. It is unknown if three medications are better than two. The sooner after exposure that ART is started the better, but after what period they become ineffective is unknown, with the US Public Health Service Guidelines recommending starting prophylaxis up to a week after exposure. They also recommend treating for a duration of four weeks based on animal studies. Their recommended regimen is emtricitabine + tenofovir + raltegravir (an INSTI). The rationale for this regimen is that it is "tolerable, potent, and conveniently administered, and it has been associated with minimal drug interactions." People who are exposed to HIV should have follow up HIV testing at 6, 12, and 24 weeks.

== Pregnancy planning ==
Women with HIV have been shown to have decreased fertility which can affect available reproductive options. In cases where the woman is HIV negative and the man is HIV positive, the primary assisted reproductive method used to prevent HIV transmission is sperm washing followed by intrauterine insemination (IUI) or in vitro fertilization (IVF). Preferably this is done after the man has achieved an undetectable plasma viral load. In the past there have been cases of HIV transmission to an HIV-negative partner through processed artificial insemination, but a large modern series in which followed 741 couples where the man had a stable viral load and semen samples were tested for HIV-1, there were no cases of HIV transmission.

For cases where the woman is HIV positive and the man is HIV negative, the usual method is artificial insemination. With appropriate treatment the risk of mother-to-child infection can be reduced to below 1%.

== History ==
Several buyers clubs sprang up since 1986 to combat HIV. The drug zidovudine (AZT), a nucleoside reverse-transcriptase inhibitor (NRTI), was not effective on its own. It was approved by the US FDA in 1987. The FDA bypassed stages of its review for safety and effectiveness in order to distribute this drug earlier. Subsequently, several more NRTIs were developed but even in combination were unable to suppress the virus for long periods of time and patients still inevitably died. To distinguish from this early antiretroviral therapy (ART), the term highly active antiretroviral therapy (HAART) was introduced. In 1996 two sequential publications in The New England Journal of Medicine by Hammer and colleagues and Gulick and colleagues illustrated the substantial benefit of combining two NRTIs with a new class of antiretrovirals, protease inhibitors, namely indinavir. This concept of three-drug therapy was quickly incorporated into clinical practice and rapidly showed impressive benefit with a 60% to 80% decline in rates of AIDS, death, and hospitalization. It would also create a new period of optimism at the 11th International AIDS Conference that was held in Vancouver that year.

As HAART became widespread, fixed dose combinations were made available to ease the administration. Later, the term combination antiretroviral therapy (cART) gained favor with some physicians as a more accurate name, not conveying to patients any misguided idea of the nature of the therapy. Today multidrug, highly effective regimens are long since the default in ART, which is why they are increasingly called simply ART instead of HAART or cART. This retronymic process is linguistically comparable to the way that the words electronic computer and digital computer at first were needed to make useful distinctions in computing technology, but with the later irrelevance of the distinction, computer alone now covers their meaning. Thus as "all computers are digital now", so "all ART is combination ART now." However, the names HAART and cART, reinforced by thousands of earlier mentions in medical literature still being regularly cited, also remain in use. In 1997, the new number of new HIV/AIDS cases in the United States would see its first significant decline at 47%, with credit going to the effectiveness of HAART.

== Research ==
People living with HIV can expect to live a nearly normal life span if able to achieve durable viral suppression on combination antiretroviral therapy. However this requires lifelong medication and will still have higher rates of cardiovascular, kidney, liver and neurologic disease. This has prompted further research towards a cure for HIV.

=== Patients cured of HIV infection ===
The so-called "Berlin patient" has been potentially cured of HIV infection and has been off of treatment since 2006 with no detectable virus. This was achieved through two bone marrow transplants that replaced his immune system with a donor's that did not have the CCR5 cell surface receptor, which is needed for some variants of HIV to enter a cell. Bone marrow transplants carry their own significant risks including potential death and was only attempted because it was necessary to treat a blood cancer he had. Attempts to replicate this have not been successful and given the risks, expense and rarity of CCR5 negative donors, bone marrow transplant is not seen as a mainstream option. It has inspired research into other methods to try to block CCR5 expression through gene therapy. A procedure zinc-finger nuclease-based gene knockout has been used in a Phase I trial of 12 humans and led to an increase in CD4 count and decrease in their viral load while off antiretroviral treatment. Attempt to reproduce this failed in 2016. Analysis of the failure showed that gene therapy only successfully treats 11–28% of cells, leaving the majority of CD4+ cells capable of being infected. The analysis found that only patients where less than 40% of cells were infected had reduced viral load. The gene therapy was not effective if the native CD4+ cells remained. This is the main limitation which must be overcome for this treatment to become effective.

After the "Berlin patient", two additional patients with both HIV infection and cancer were reported to have no traceable HIV virus after successful stem cell transplants. Virologist Annemarie Wensing of the University Medical Center Utrecht announced this development during her presentation at the 2016 "Towards an HIV Cure" symposium. However, these two patients are still on antiretroviral therapy, which is not the case for the Berlin patient. Therefore, it is not known whether or not the two patients are cured of HIV infection. The cure might be confirmed if the therapy were to be stopped and no viral rebound occurred.

In March 2019, a second patient, referred to as the "London Patient", was confirmed to be in complete remission of HIV. Like the Berlin Patient, the London Patient received a bone marrow transplant from a donor who has the same CCR5 mutation. He has been off antiviral drugs since September 2017, indicating the Berlin Patient was not a "one-off".

Alternative approaches aiming to mimic one's biological immunity to HIV through the absence or mutation of the CCR5 gene is being conducted in current research efforts. The efforts of which are done through the introduction of induced pluripotent stem cells that have been CCR5 disrupted through the CRISPR/Cas9 gene editing system.

=== Viral reservoirs ===
The main obstacle to complete elimination of HIV infection by conventional antiretroviral therapy is that HIV is able to integrate itself into the DNA of host cells and rest in a latent state, while antiretrovirals only attack actively replicating HIV. The cells in which HIV lies dormant are called the viral reservoir, and one of the main sources is thought to be central memory and transitional memory CD4+ T cells. Among the various cells that are vulnerable to HIV-1 infection, CD4+ T cells, dendritic cells, and macrophages are the most extensively characterized as reservoirs for HIV-1 and as carriers of the integrated provirus. 2014 there were reports of the cure of HIV in two infants, presumably due to the fact that treatment was initiated within hours of infection, preventing HIV from establishing a deep reservoir. There is work being done to try to activate reservoir cells into replication so that the virus is forced out of latency and can be attacked by antiretrovirals and the host immune system. Targets include histone deacetylase (HDAC) which represses transcription and if inhibited can lead to increased cell activation. The HDAC inhibitors valproic acid and vorinostat have been used in human trials with only preliminary results so far.

=== Immune activation ===
Even with all latent virus deactivated, it is thought that a vigorous immune response will need to be induced to clear all the remaining infected cells. Strategies include using cytokines to restore CD4+ cell counts as well as therapeutic vaccines to prime immune responses. One such candidate vaccine is Tat Oyi, developed by Biosantech. This vaccine is based on the HIV protein tat. Animal models have shown the generation of neutralizing antibodies and lower levels of HIV viremia.

=== Sequential mRNA vaccine ===
HIV vaccine development is an active area of research and an important tool for managing the global AIDS epidemic. Research into a vaccine for HIV has been ongoing for decades with no lasting success for preventing infection. The rapid development, though, of mRNA vaccines to deal with the COVID-19 pandemic may provide a new path forward.

Like SARS-CoV-2, the virus that causes COVID-19, HIV has a spike protein. In retroviruses like HIV, the spike protein is formed by two proteins expressed by the Env gene. This viral envelope binds to the host cell's receptor and is what gains the virus entry into the cell. With mRNA vaccines, mRNA or messenger RNA, contains the instructions for how to make the spike protein. The mRNA is put into lipid-based nanoparticles for drug delivery. This was a key breakthrough in optimizing the efficiency and efficacy of in vivo delivery. When the vaccine is injected, the mRNA enters cells and joins up with a ribosome. The ribosome then translates the mRNA instructions into the spike protein. The immune system detects the presence of the spike protein and B cells, a type of white blood cell, begin to develop antibodies. Should the actual virus later enter the system, the external spike protein will be recognized by memory B cells, whose function is to memorize the characteristics of the original antigen. Memory B cells then produce the antibodies, hopefully destroying the virus before it can bind to another cell and repeat the HIV life cycle.

SARS-CoV-2 and HIV-1 have similarities—notably both are RNA viruses—but there are important differences. As a retrovirus, HIV-1 can insert a copy of its RNA genome into the host's DNA, making total eradication more difficult. The virus is also highly mutable making it a challenge for the adaptive immune system to develop a response. As a chronic infection, HIV-1 and the adaptive immune system undergo reciprocal selective pressures leading to the evolutionary arms race of coevolution.

Broadly neutralizing HIV-1 antibodies, or bnAbs, have been shown to attach to the Env spike protein envelope regardless of the specific HIV mutations. This bodes well for vaccine development. Complicating matters, though, naive B cells—mature B cells not yet exposed to any antigen and are the progenitors of bnAbs—are rare. Further, the mutation events needed to turn these B cells into bnAbs are also rare. Because of this, there is a growing consensus that an effective HIV vaccine will need to create not only humoral (antibody-mediated) immunity, but a T-cell-mediated immunity.

mRNA vaccines have advantages over traditional vaccines which may help deal with some of the challenges presented by the HIV virus. The mRNA in the vaccine only codes for the protein spike, not the whole virus, so the possibility of reverse transcription, where the virus copies its genetic material into the host's genome, is not present. Another advantage when compared to traditional vaccines is the speed of development. mRNA vaccines take months not years, which means a multipart sequential vaccine regime is possible.

Attempts to elicit an immune response that triggers broadly neutralizing antibodies (bnAbs) with a single vaccine dose have been unsuccessful. A multipart sequential mRNA vaccine regime, however, might guide the immune response in the right direction. The first shot triggers an immune response for the correct naive B cells. Later vaccinations encourage the development of these cells further, eventually turning them into memory b cells, and later into plasma cells, which can secrete the broadly neutralizing antibodies:

In essence, the sequential immunization approach represents an attempt to mimic Env evolution that would occur with natural infection.... In contrast to traditional prime/boost strategies, in which the same immunogen is used repeatedly for vaccination, the sequential immunization approach relies on a series of different immunogens with the goal of eventually inducing bnAb(s).

A Phase 1 clinical trial by Scripps Research and the International AIDS Vaccine Initiative of an mRNA vaccine showed that 97 percent of participants had the desired initial "priming" immune response of naive b cells. This is a positive result for developing the first shot in a vaccine sequence. Moderna is partnering with Scripps and the International AIDS Vaccine Initiative for a follow-up phase 1 clinical trial of an HIV mRNA vaccine (mRNA-1644) starting later in 2021.

== Drug advertisements ==
Direct-to-consumer and other advertisements for HIV drugs in the past were criticized for their use of healthy, glamorous models rather than typical people with HIV/AIDS. Usually, these people will present with debilitating conditions or illnesses as a result of HIV/AIDS. In contrast, by featuring people in unrealistically strenuous activities, such as mountain climbing; this proved to be offensive and insensitive to the suffering of people who are HIV positive. The US FDA reprimanded multiple pharmaceutical manufacturers for publishing such adverts in 2001, as the misleading advertisements harmed consumers by implying unproven benefits and failing to disclose important information about the drugs.

== Beyond medical management ==
The preamble to the World Health Organization's Constitution defines health as "a state of complete physical, mental and social well-being and not merely the absence of disease or infirmity." Those living with HIV today are met with other challenges that go beyond the singular goal of lowering their viral load. A 2009 meta-analysis studying the correlates of HIV-stigma found that individuals living with higher stigma burden were more likely to have poorer physical and mental health. Insufficient social support and delayed diagnosis due to decreased frequency of HIV testing and knowledge of risk reduction were cited as some of the reasons. People living with HIV (PLHIV) have lower health related quality of life (HRQoL) scores than do the general population. The stigma of having HIV is often compounded with the stigma of identifying with the LGBTQ community or the stigma of being an injecting drug user (IDU) even though heterosexual sexual transmission accounts for 85% of all HIV-1 infections worldwide. AIDS has been cited as the most heavily stigmatized medical condition among infectious diseases. Part of the consequence of this stigma toward PLHIV is the belief that they are seen as responsible for their status and less deserving of treatment.

A 2016 study sharing the WHO's definition of health critiques its 90-90-90 target goal, which is part of a larger strategy that aims to eliminate the AIDS epidemic as a public health threat by 2030, by arguing that it does not go far enough in ensuring the holistic health of PLHIV. The study suggests that maintenance of HIV and AIDS should go beyond the suppression of viral load and the prevention of opportunistic infection. It proposes adding a 'fourth 90' addressing a new 'quality of life' target that would focus specifically on increasing the quality of life for those that are able to suppress their viral load to undetectable levels along with new metrics to track the progress toward that target. This study serves as an example of the shifting paradigm in the dynamics of the health care system from being heavily 'disease-oriented' to more 'human-centered'. Though questions remain of what exactly a more 'human-centered' method of treatment looks like in practice, it generally aims to ask what kind of support, other than medical support, PLHIV need to cope with and eliminate HIV-related stigmas. Campaigns and marketing aimed at educating the general public in order to reduce any misplaced fears of HIV contraction is one example. Also encouraged is the capacity-building and guided development of PLHIV into more leadership roles with the goal of having a greater representation of this population in decision making positions. Structural legal intervention has also been proposed, specifically referring to legal interventions to put in place protections against discrimination and improve access to employment opportunities. On the side of the practitioner, greater competence for the experience of people living with HIV is encouraged alongside the promotion of an environment of nonjudgment and confidentiality.

Psychosocial group interventions such as psychotherapy, relaxation, group support, and education may have some beneficial effects on depression in HIV positive people.

== Food insecurity ==
The successful treatment and management of HIV/AIDS is affected by a plethora of factors which ranges from successfully taking prescribed medications, preventing opportunistic infection, and food access etc. Food insecurity is a condition in which households lack access to adequate food because of limited money or other resources. Food insecurity is a global issue that has affected billions of people yearly, including those living in developed countries.

Food insecurity is a major public health disparity in the United States of America, which significantly affects minority groups, people living at or below the poverty line, and those who are living with one or more morbidity. As of December 31, 2017, there were approximately 126,742 people living with HIV/AIDS (PLWHA) in NYC, of whom 87.6% can be described as living with some level of poverty and food insecurity as reported by the NYC Department of Health on March 31, 2019. Having access to a consistent food supply that is safe and healthy is an important part in the treatment and management of HIV/AIDS. PLWHA are also greatly affected by food inequities and food deserts which causes them to be food insecure. Food insecurity, which can cause malnutrition, can also negatively impact HIV treatment and recovery from opportunistic infections. Similarly, PLWHA require additional calories and nutritionally support that require foods free from contamination to prevent further immunocompromising. Food insecurity can further exacerbate the progression of HIV/AIDS and can prevent PLWHA from consistently following their prescribed regimen, which will lead to poor outcomes.

It is imperative that these food insecurity among PLWHA are addressed and rectified to reduce this health inequity. It is important to recognized that socioeconomic status, access to medical care, geographic location, public policy, race and ethnicity all play a pivotal role in the treatment and management of HIV/AIDS. The lack of sufficient and constant income does limit the options for food, treatment, and medications. The same can be inferred for those who are among the oppressed groups in society who are marginalized and may be less inclined or encouraged to seek care and assistance. Endeavors to address food insecurity should be included in HIV treatment programs and may help improve health outcomes if it also focuses on health equity among the diagnosed as much as it focuses on medications. Access to consistently safe and nutritious foods is one of the most important facets in ensuring PLWHA are being provided the best possible care. By altering the narratives for HIV treatment so that more support can be garnered to reduce food insecurity and other health disparities mortality rates will decrease for people living with HIV/AIDS.

== See also ==
- AV-HALT
- Discovery and development of HIV-protease inhibitors
- Discovery and development of non-nucleoside reverse-transcriptase inhibitors
- Discovery and development of nucleoside and nucleotide reverse-transcriptase inhibitors
- HIV capsid inhibition
