= OX1001 =

Chemical compound

Legal status
- Legal status: Experimental

Identifiers
- IUPAC name: [1-[(4aS,8aS)-3-(tert-butylcarbamoyl)-3,4,4a,5,6,7,8,8a-octahydro-1H-isoquinolin-2-yl]-3-[[4-amino-4-oxo-2-(quinoline-2-carbonylamino)butanoyl]amino]-4-phenylbutan-2-yl] nitrate
- CAS Number: 1172576-50-9
- PubChem CID: 71592695
- ChemSpider: 32033361

Chemical and physical data
- Formula: C_{38}H_{49}N_{7}O_{7}
- Molar mass: 715.852 g·mol^{−1}
- 3D model (JSmol): Interactive image
- SMILES: CC(C)(C)NC(=O)[C@@H]1C[C@@H]2CCCC[C@@H]2CN1C[C@H]([C@H](CC3=CC=CC=C3)NC(=O)[C@H](CC(=O)N)NC(=O)C4=NC5=CC=CC=C5C=C4)O[N+](=O)[O-]
- InChI: InChI=1S/C38H49N7O7/c1-38(2,3)43-37(49)32-20-26-14-7-8-15-27(26)22-44(32)23-33(52-45(50)51)30(19-24-11-5-4-6-12-24)41-36(48)31(21-34(39)46)42-35(47)29-18-17-25-13-9-10-16-28(25)40-29/h4-6,9-13,16-18,26-27,30-33H,7-8,14-15,19-23H2,1-3H3,(H2,39,46)(H,41,48)(H,42,47)(H,43,49)/t26-,27+,30-,31-,32-,33+/m0/s1; Key:SPHXNRBWPVEVAS-UGJKXSETSA-N

OX1001 (saquinavir-NO) is an experimental drug being developed by OncoNOx currently undergoing clinical studies and investigations for the treatment of cancer. OX1001 is a nitrate ester analog of the approved HIV protease inhibitor, saquinavir. This modification increases the anti-cancer property while decreasing toxicity of the drug. OX1001 shows broad activity against cancer cells but is particularly effective against hematological, prostate, and melanoma cancers as seen in in vitro and in vivo studies.

== Mechanism of action ==
OX1001 is an analog of the already approved HIV protease inhibitor, saquinavir. HIV protease inhibitor drugs not only work against HIV, but they also have proved function in anti-cancer therapy. However, these drugs tend to have many toxic effects. Adding a nitrate ester functional group to HIV protease inhibitors has been found to curb these negative effects as well as increase the anti-tumor properties of the drug.

Because OX1001 is still in pre-clinical testing, its mechanism of action is unclear. However, it can be said that as opposed to saquinavir, OX1001 likely works by slowing the growth rate of tumor cells rather than by causing apoptosis, or cell death. Studies suggest that this stoppage of cell proliferation is permanent.

Though the difference between OX1001 and saquinavir lies in the presence of a nitrate ester, it is not clear how exactly this modification directly affects the function of the drug. It can be hypothesized that the presence of the nitrate ester plays a role in inhibiting the activity of cytochrome P450, which is an enzyme that normally deactivates saquinavir.

Aside from having superior anti-tumor properties, OX1001 also has a much lower toxicity profile than saquinavir. In one experiment, it was determined that at a dose where Saquinavir produced 100% toxicity, OX1001 showed no signs of inducing any toxicity. This might be due to the drug’s ability to produce a powerful, yet short-lived stimulus to normal cells’ Akt signaling pathways which protects them.
