= Atazanavir/ritonavir =

Combination drug for HIV

Combination of
- Atazanavir: Protease inhibitor
- Ritonavir: Protease inhibitor (pharmacokinetic booster)

Clinical data
- Trade names: Ritovaz
- Other names: Anzavir-R, ritonavir/atazanavir
- Routes of administration: By mouth
- ATC code: J05AR23 (WHO)

Legal status
- Legal status: In general: ℞ (Prescription only)

Atazanavir/ritonavir (ATV/r) is a fixed-dose combination antiretroviral medication used in the treatment of HIV/AIDS. It combines atazanavir and ritonavir. It may be used instead of lopinavir/ritonavir. It is taken by mouth.

Side effects are generally minimal. They may include abdominal pain, diarrhea, yellowish skin, muscle pains, and headache. Greater care should be taken in people with underlying liver problems. Use in pregnancy appears to be safe. In the combination atazanavir functions as a protease inhibitor and ritonavir functions to increase levels of atazanavir.

The combination was approved for use in India in 2012. It is on the World Health Organization's List of Essential Medicines.
