= HIV-1 protease =

Enzyme involved with peptide bond hydrolysis in retroviruses

HIV-1 Protease (Retropepsin)
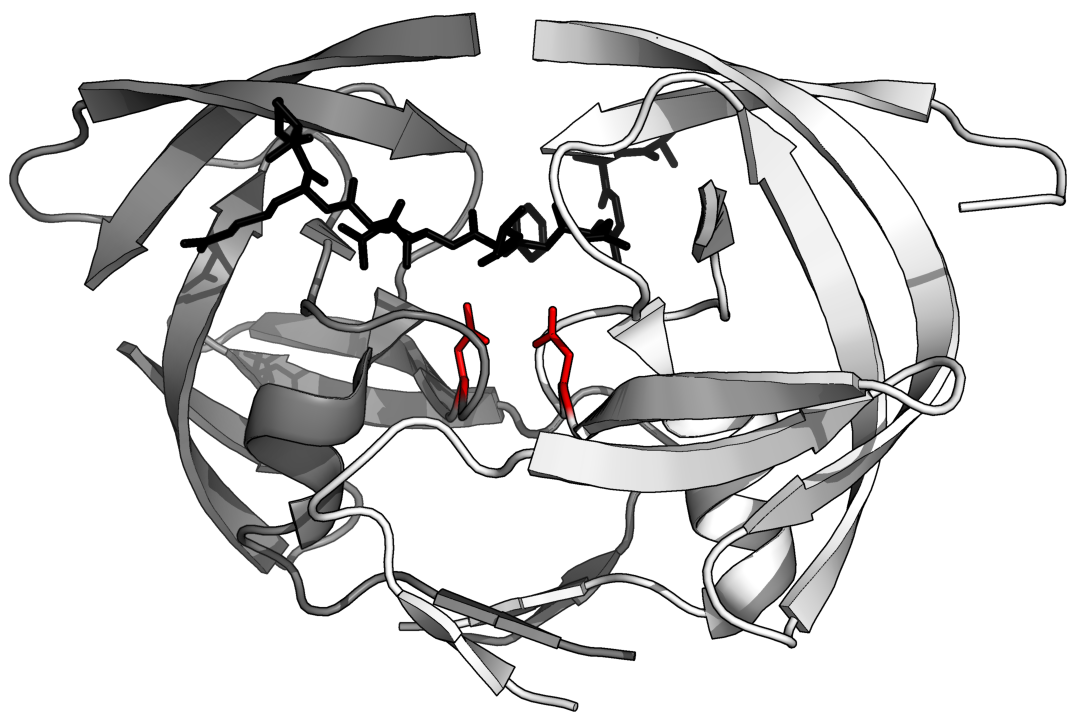
- HIV-1 protease dimer in white and grey, with peptide substrate in black and active site aspartate side chains in red. (PDB: 1KJF)

Identifiers
- EC no.: 3.4.23.16
- CAS no.: 144114-21-6

Databases
- BRENDA: enzyme data
- ExPASy: NiceZyme view
- KEGG: enzyme entry
- MetaCyc: metabolic pathway
- Rhea: reactions
- PDB structures: RCSB PDB PDBe PDBsum
- Gene Ontology: AmiGO / QuickGO
Search
- PMC: articles
- PubMed: articles
- NCBI: proteins

HIV-1 protease or PR is a retroviral aspartyl protease (retropepsin), an enzyme involved with peptide bond hydrolysis in retroviruses, that is essential for the life-cycle of HIV, the retrovirus that causes AIDS. HIV-1 PR cleaves newly synthesized polyproteins (namely, Gag and Gag-Pol) at nine cleavage sites to create the mature protein components of an HIV virion, the infectious form of a virus outside of the host cell. Without effective HIV-1 PR, HIV virions remain uninfectious.

== Structure ==
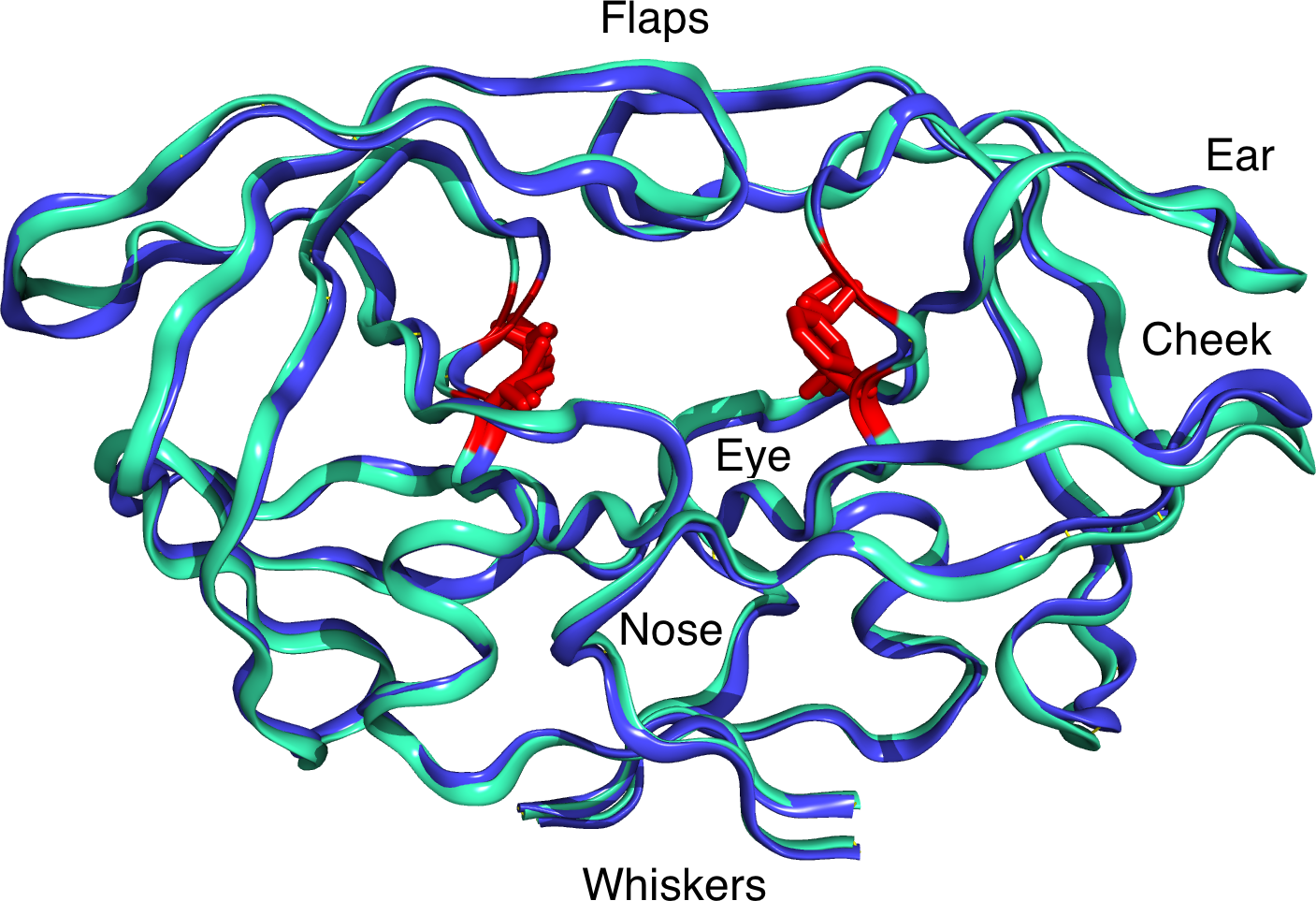
HIV-1 protease labelled according to its resemblance to an English Bulldog or a fat cat. The blue and cyan-green ribbons depict the peptide backbone of a wild-type (1KZK) and a mutant (1D4S) structure, respectively.

Mature HIV protease exists as a 22 kDa homodimer, with each subunit made up of 99 amino acids. A single active site lies between the identical subunits and has the characteristic Asp-Thr-Gly (Asp25, Thr26 and Gly27) catalytic triad sequence common to aspartic proteases. As HIV-1 PR can only function as a dimer, the mature protease contains two Asp25 amino acids, one from each monomer, that act in conjunction with each other as the catalytic residues. Additionally, HIV protease has two molecular "flaps" which move a distance of up to 7 Å when the enzyme becomes associated with a substrate. This can be visualized with animations of the flaps opening and closing.

== Biosynthesis ==
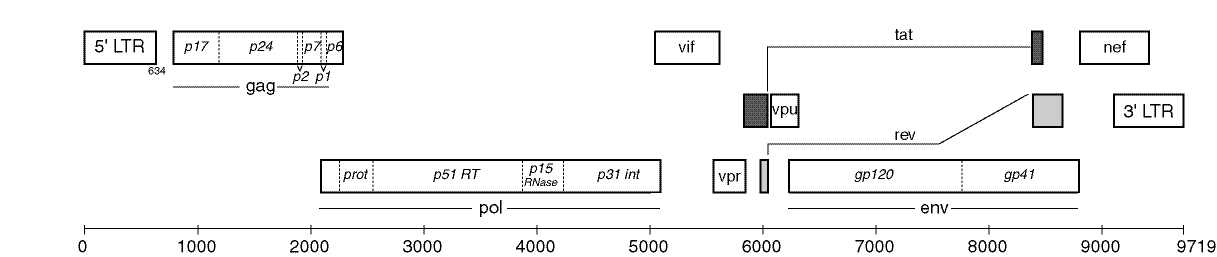
The Gag-Pol region containing the protease gene flanked by p6^{pol} at the N-terminus and reverse transcriptase at the C-terminus. "Hxb2genome"

=== Precursor ===
The Gag-Pol polyprotein, which contains premature coding proteins, including HIV-1 PR. PR is located between the reverse transcriptase (which is at the C-terminus of PR) and the p6^{pol} (which is at the N-terminus of PR) of the transframe region (TFR).

In order for this precursor to become a functional protein, each monomer must associate with another HIV-1 PR monomer to form a functional catalytic active site by each contributing the Asp25 of their respective catalytic triads.

=== Synthesis Mechanism ===
When viral HIV-RNA enters the cell, it is accompanied by a reverse transcriptase, an integrase, and a mature HIV-1 PR. The reverse transcriptase converts viral RNA into DNA, facilitating the integrase's role in incorporating viral genetic information with the host cell DNA. The viral DNA can either remain dormant in the nucleus or be transcribed into mRNA and translated by the host cell into the Gag-Pol polyprotein, which would then be cleaved into individual functional proteins (including a newly synthesized HIV-1 PR) by the mature HIV-1 PR.

The HIV-1 PR precursor catalyzes its own production by facilitating its cleavage from the Gag-Pol polyprotein in a mechanism known as auto-processing. Auto-processing of HIV-1 PR is characterized by two sequential steps: (1) the intramolecular cleavage of the N-terminus at the p6^{pol}-protease cleavage site, which serves to finalize PR processing and increase enzymatic activity with the newly formed PR-reverse transcriptase intermediate, and (2) the intermolecular cleavage of the C-terminus at the protease-reverse transcriptase cleavage site, leading to the assembly of two PR subunits into mature dimers. Dimerization of the two subunits allows for fully functional, combined active site, characterized by two Asp25 catalytic residues (one from each monomer), to form.

The HIV-1 protease dimer (green and cyan) with active site Asp-25 in red.

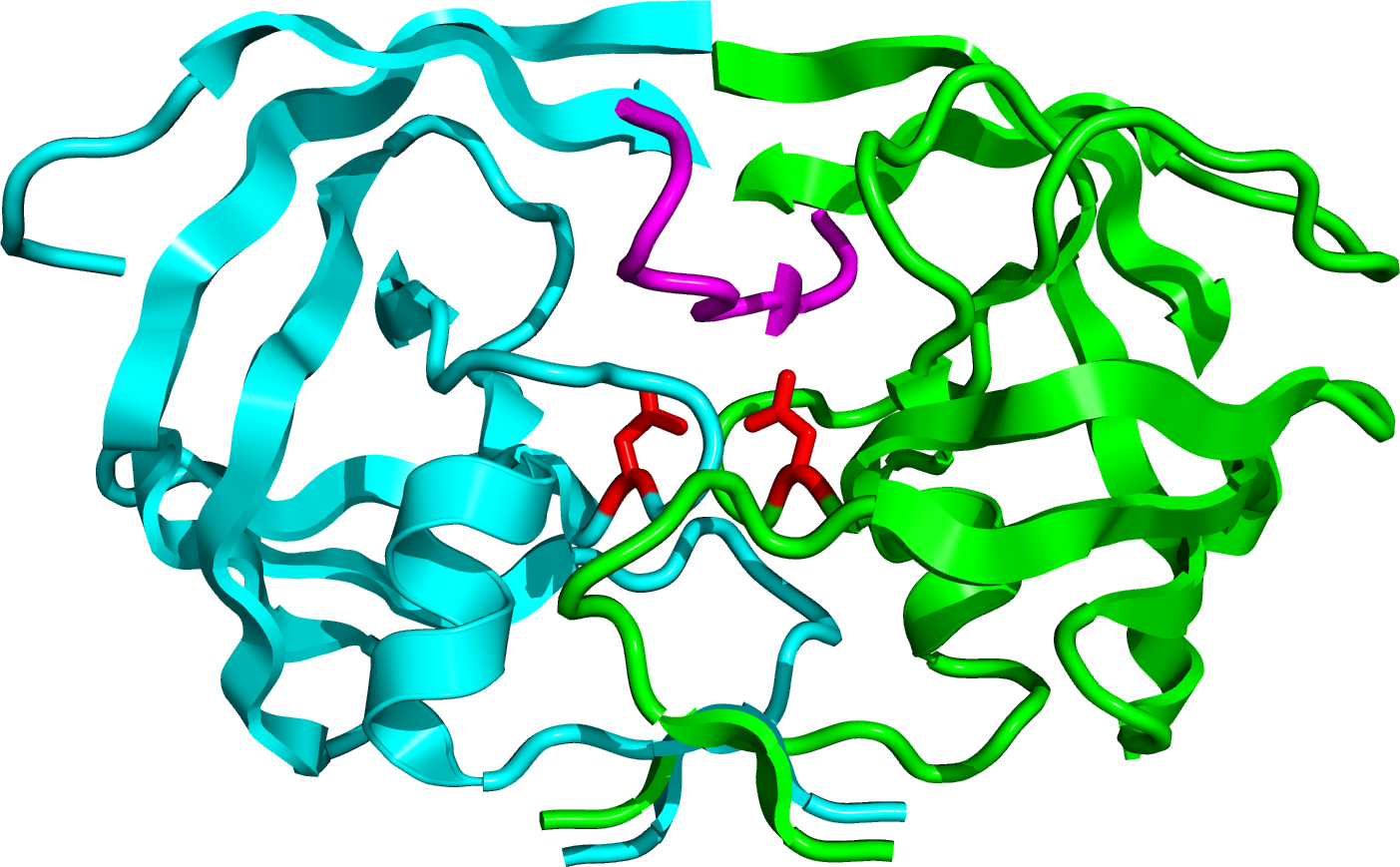
Complexed with a polypeptide substrate (magenta). (PDB: 1KJF)

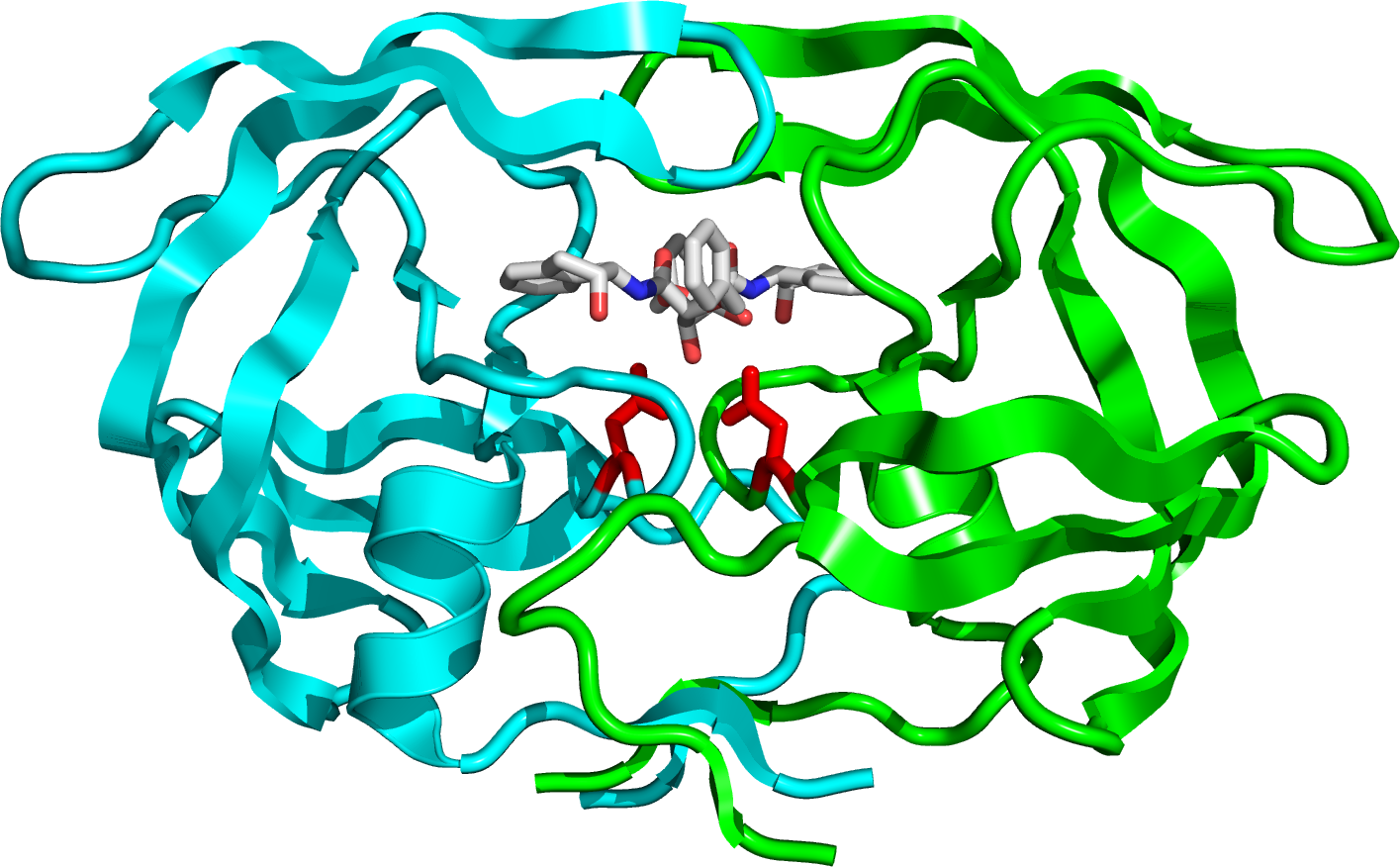
Complexed with inhibitor BEA369 (depicted as a sticks with carbon in white, nitrogen in blue, oxygen in red). (PDB: 1EBY)

== Function ==
HIV-1 PR serves a dual purpose. Precursor HIV-1 PR is responsible for catalyzing its own production into mature PR enzymes via PR auto-processing. Mature protease is able to hydrolyze peptide bonds on the Gag-Pol polyproteins at nine specific sites, processing the resulting subunits into mature, fully functional proteins. These cleaved proteins, including reverse transcriptase, integrase, and RNaseH, are encoded by the coding region components necessary for viral replication.

== Mechanism ==
As an aspartic protease, the dimerized HIV-1 PR functions through the aspartyl group complex, in order to perform hydrolysis. Of the two Asp25 residues on the combined catalytic active site of HIV-1 PR, one is deprotonated while the other is protonated, due to pKa differences from the micro-environment.

In a general aspartic protease mechanism, once the substrate is properly bound to the active site of the enzyme, the deprotonated Asp25 catalytic amino acid undergoes base catalysis, rendering the incoming water molecule a better nucleophile by deprotonating it. The resulting hydroxyl ion attacks the carbonyl carbon of the peptide bond, forming an intermediate with a transient oxyanion, which is stabilized by the initially protonated Asp25. The oxyanion re-forms a double bond, leading to the cleavage of the peptide bond between the two amino acids, while the initially deprotonated Asp25 undergoes acid catalysis to donate its proton to the amino group, making the amino group a better leaving group for complete peptide bond cleavage and returning to its original deprotonated state.

While HIV-1 PR shares many of the same characteristics as a non-viral aspartic protease, some evidence has shown that HIV-1 PR catalyzes hydrolysis in a concerted manner; in other words, the nucleophilic water molecule and the protonated Asp25 simultaneously attack the scissile peptide bond during catalysis.

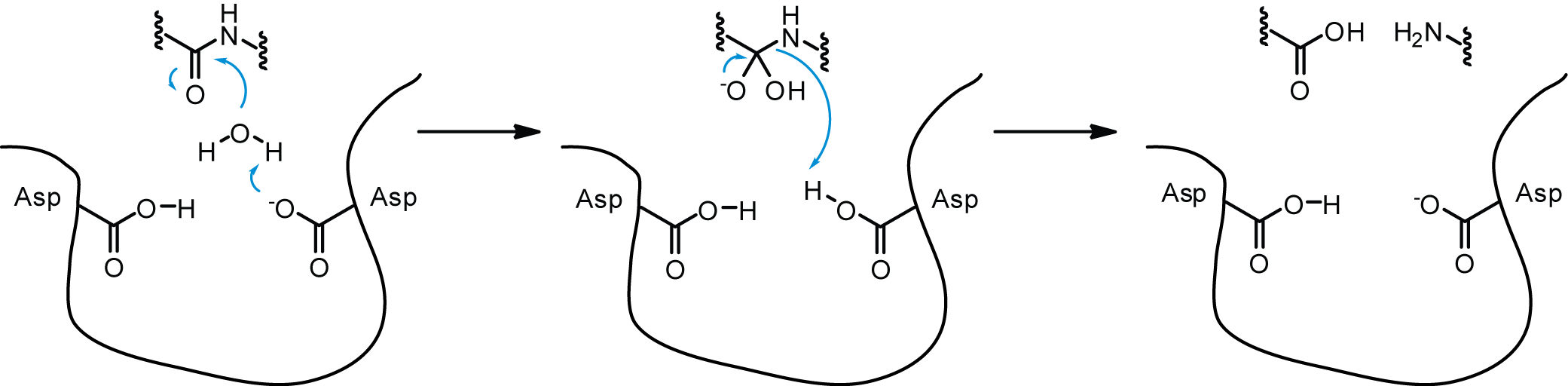
The catalytic mechanism of a general aspartyl protease, containing the two characteristic Asp25 residues in the deprotonated and protonated forms. "Aspartyl proteae mechanism.png"

== As a drug target ==
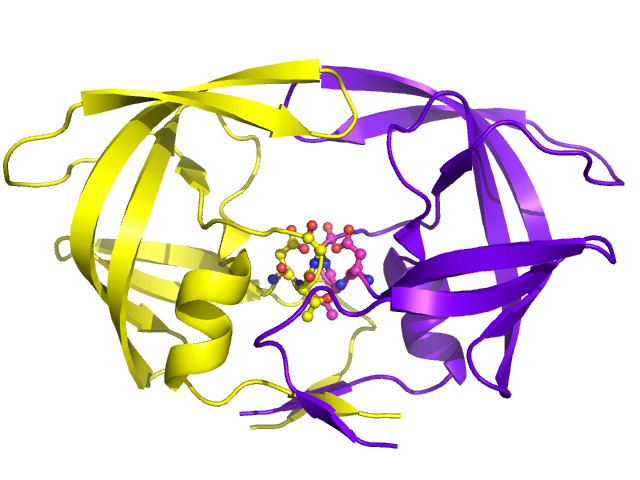
HIV-1 Protease has the classic AspThrGly of Aspartyl Proteases. These amino acids are located at position 25, 26, and 27, and are responsible for the catalytic activity.

With its integral role in HIV replication, HIV protease has been a prime target for drug therapy. HIV protease inhibitors work by specifically binding to the active site by mimicking the tetrahedral intermediate of its substrate and essentially becoming “stuck,” in the catalytic cycle, disabling the enzyme. After assembly and budding, viral particles lacking active protease cannot mature into infectious virions. Several protease inhibitors have been licensed for HIV therapy.

There are ten HIV-1 PR inhibitors that are currently approved by the Food and Drug Administration: indinavir, saquinavir, ritonavir, nelfinavir, lopinavir, amprenavir, fosamprenevir, atazanavir, tipranavir, and darunavir. Many of the inhibitors have different molecular components and thus different mechanistic actions, such as blocking the active site. Their functional roles also extend to influencing circulation concentrations of other inhibitor drugs (ritonavir) and being used only for certain circumstances in which the virus exhibits tolerance of other inhibitors (tipranavir).

=== Evolution and resistance ===
Due to the high mutation rates of retroviruses, especially due to mutationally sensitive regions (notably the region containing the catalytic triad sequence), and considering that changes to a few amino acids within HIV protease can render it much less visible to an inhibitor, the residues at the active site of this enzyme can change rapidly when under the selective pressure of replication-inhibiting drugs. Despite most of known resistant mutations that can affect the stability of the HIV-1 PR, the protein could still perform its catalytic activity, sometimes facilitated by compensatory mutations.

Two types of mutations are generally associated with increasing drug resistance: "major" mutations and "secondary" mutations. Major mutations involve a mutation on the active site of HIV-1 PR, preventing the selective inhibitors from binding it. Secondary mutations refer to molecular changes on the periphery of the enzyme due to prolonged exposure to similar chemicals, potentially affecting inhibitor specificity for HIV-1 PR.

One approach to minimizing the development of drug-resistance in HIV is to administer a combination of drugs which inhibit several key aspects of the HIV replication cycle simultaneously, rather than one drug at a time. Other drug therapy targets include reverse transcriptase, virus attachment, membrane fusion, cDNA integration and virion assembly.

== See also ==
- Management of HIV/AIDS
- Discovery and development of HIV-protease inhibitors
