= Simnotrelvir/ritonavir =

Antiviral combination medication

- Chemical structures of simnotrelvir (top) and ritonavir (bottom)

Combination of
- Simnotrelvir: SARS-CoV-2 3CL^{pro} inhibitor
- Ritonavir: Protease inhibitor

Clinical data
- Trade names: 先诺欣 (Xiannuoxin)
- Pregnancy category: Contraindicated (CN)
- Routes of administration: Oral

Legal status
- Legal status: Rx in China

Simnotrelvir
Clinical data
- Other names: SIM0417, SSD8432
- Routes of administration: Oral
- Drug class: SARS-CoV-2 3CL^{pro} inhibitor

Legal status
- Legal status: Not approved on its own

Pharmacokinetic data
- Protein binding: 72.5%
- Metabolism: hepatic (CYP3A)
- Elimination half-life: 3.1 h; 4.1 h with ritonavir
- Excretion: urine (55.4%), feces (36.7%)

Identifiers
- IUPAC name: (8S)-N-[(1S)-1-cyano-2-[(3S)-2-oxopyrrolidin-3-yl]ethyl]-7-[(2S)-3,3-dimethyl-2-[(2,2,2-trifluoroacetyl)amino]butanoyl]-1,4-dithia-7-azaspiro[4.4]nonane-8-carboxamide
- PubChem CID: 168476146

Chemical and physical data
- Formula: C_{22}H_{30}F_{3}N_{5}O_{4}S_{2}
- Molar mass: 549.63 g·mol^{−1}
- 3D model (JSmol): Interactive image
- SMILES: CC(C)(C)[C@@H](C(=O)N1CC2(C[C@H]1C(=O)N[C@@H](C[C@@H]3CCNC3=O)C#N)SCCS2)NC(=O)C(F)(F)F
- InChI: InChI=InChI=1S/C22H30F3N5O4S2/c1-20(2,3)15(29-19(34)22(23,24)25)18(33)30-11-21(35-6-7-36-21)9-14(30)17(32)28-13(10-26)8-12-4-5-27-16(12)31/h12-15H,4-9,11H2,1-3H3,(H,27,31)(H,28,32)(H,29,34)/t12-,13-,14-,15+/m0/s1; Key:LQBRGTAIBBFUJJ-ZQDZILKHSA-N

Simnotrelvir/ritonavir (trade name Xiannuoxin) is a pharmaceutical drug used for the treatment of COVID-19. Simnotrelvir/ritonavir is a combination drug of simnotrelvir, an inhibitor of SARS-CoV-2 3CL^{pro}, and ritonavir, a CYP3A inhibitor.

It was developed by Simcere Pharmaceutical and conditionally approved in China by the National Medical Products Administration (NMPA) in January 2023. Results for the phase Ib trial are available. In a phase II/III trial, it reduced the duration of symptoms by a median of 36 hours compared to placebo.

== See also ==
- Nirmatrelvir/ritonavir
