= Amprenavir =

Chemical compound

Clinical data
- Trade names: Agenerase
- AHFS/Drugs.com: Monograph
- MedlinePlus: a699051
- License data: EU EMA: by INN; US FDA: Amprenavir
- Routes of administration: Oral (capsules)
- ATC code: J05AE05 (WHO)

Legal status
- Legal status: In general: ℞ (Prescription only)

Pharmacokinetic data
- Protein binding: 90%
- Metabolism: Hepatic
- Elimination half-life: 7.1–10.6 hours
- Excretion: <3% renal

Identifiers
- IUPAC name: (3S)-oxolan-3-yl N-[(2S,3R)-3-hydroxy-4-[N-(2-methylpropyl)(4-aminobenzene)sulfonamido]-1-phenylbutan-2-yl]carbamate
- CAS Number: 161814-49-9
- PubChem CID: 65016
- DrugBank: DB00701
- ChemSpider: 58532
- UNII: 5S0W860XNR
- KEGG: D00894
- ChEBI: CHEBI:40050
- ChEMBL: ChEMBL116
- NIAID ChemDB: 006080
- CompTox Dashboard (EPA): DTXSID5046061
- ECHA InfoCard: 100.262.589

Chemical and physical data
- Formula: C_{25}H_{35}N_{3}O_{6}S
- Molar mass: 505.63 g·mol^{−1}
- 3D model (JSmol): Interactive image
- SMILES: O=C(O[C@H]1CCOC1)N[C@@H](Cc2ccccc2)[C@H](O)CN(CC(C)C)S(=O)(=O)c3ccc(N)cc3
- InChI: InChI=1S/C25H35N3O6S/c1-18(2)15-28(35(31,32)22-10-8-20(26)9-11-22)16-24(29)23(14-19-6-4-3-5-7-19)27-25(30)34-21-12-13-33-17-21/h3-11,18,21,23-24,29H,12-17,26H2,1-2H3,(H,27,30)/t21-,23-,24+/m0/s1; Key:YMARZQAQMVYCKC-OEMFJLHTSA-N

Amprenavir (original brand name Agenerase, GlaxoSmithKline) is a protease inhibitor used to treat HIV infection. It was approved by the Food and Drug Administration on April 15, 1999, for twice-a-day dosing instead of needing to be taken every eight hours. The convenient dosing came at a price, as the dose required is 1,200 mg, delivered in eight very large 150 mg gel capsules or twenty-four 50 mg gel capsules, twice daily.

It was patented in 1992 and approved for medical use in 1999. Production of amprenavir was discontinued by the manufacturer on December 31, 2004; a prodrug version (fosamprenavir), is available.

== Background ==
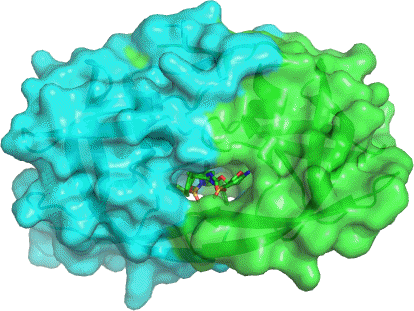
HIV-1 protease dimer with amprenavir (sticks) bound in the active site. PDB entry 3nu3

Research aimed at development of renin inhibitors as potential antihypertensive agents had led to the discovery of compounds that blocked the action of this peptide cleaving enzyme. The amino acid sequence cleaved by renin was found to be fortuitously the same as that required to produce the HIV peptide coat. Structure–activity studies on renin inhibitors proved to be of great value for developing HIV protease inhibitors. Incorporation of an amino alcohol moiety proved crucial to inhibitory activity for many of these agents. This unit is closely related to the one found in the statine, an unusual amino acid that forms part of the pepstatin, a fermentation product that inhibits protease enzymes.
