= Protease inhibitor (pharmacology) =

Class of antiviral drugs used to treat HIV/AIDS and hepatitis C

Protease inhibitors (PIs) are medications that act by interfering with enzymes that cleave proteins. Some of the most well known are antiviral drugs widely used to treat HIV/AIDS, hepatitis C and COVID-19. These protease inhibitors prevent viral replication by selectively binding to viral proteases (e.g. HIV-1 protease) and blocking proteolytic cleavage of protein precursors that are necessary for the production of infectious viral particles.

Protease inhibitors that have been developed and are currently used in clinical practice include:

- Antiretroviral HIV-1 protease inhibitors—class stem –navir
  - Amprenavir
  - Atazanavir
  - Darunavir
  - Fosamprenavir
  - Indinavir
  - Lopinavir
  - Nelfinavir
  - Ritonavir
  - Saquinavir
  - Tipranavir
- Hepatitis C virus NS3/4A protease inhibitors—class stem –previr
  - Asunaprevir
  - Boceprevir
  - Grazoprevir
  - Glecaprevir
  - Paritaprevir
  - Simeprevir
  - Telaprevir
  - Voxilaprevir
- 3-chymotrypsin-like protease (including, but not limited to, severe acute respiratory syndrome coronavirus 2) inhibitors—class stem –trelvir
  - Ensitrelvir
  - Nirmatrelvir
  - Simnotrelvir

Given the specificity of the target of these drugs there is the risk, like with antibiotics, of the development of drug-resistant mutated viruses. To reduce this risk, it is common to use several different drugs together that are each aimed at different targets.

In addition to those non-human proteases listed above, inhibitors of human proteases may be used to treat cancer. See the articles matrix metalloproteinase inhibitor (–mastat) and proteasome inhibitor (–zomib).

== Antiretroviral protease inhibitors ==
Antiretroviral protease inhibitors act by binding to the catalytic site of HIV protease, preventing cleavage of viral polyprotein precursor proteins into functional viral proteins required for viral replication. Most ARPIs are peptide-like molecules which resemble the substrate of the viral protease.

Protease inhibitors were the second class of antiretroviral drugs developed. The first members of this class, saquinavir, ritonavir, and indinavir, were approved in late 1995–1996. Within two years, annual deaths from AIDS in the United States fell from over 50,000 to approximately 18,000. Prior to this the annual death rate had been increasing by approximately 20% each year.

The number of people in the U.S. dying of HIV fell by 60% in the 2 years following the introduction of the first HIV protease inhibitors

Name	Trade name	Company	Patent	FDA approval date	Notes
Saquinavir	Invirase, Fortovase	Hoffmann–La Roche	U.S. patent 5,196,438	December 6, 1995	The first protease inhibitor approved by the U.S. Food and Drug Administration (FDA).
Ritonavir	Norvir	AbbVie	U.S. patent 5,541,206	March 1, 1996	AbbVie was part of Abbott Laboratories when patent was granted. As well as being a protease inhibitor in its own right, ritonavir inhibits the breakdown of other protease inhibitors. This property makes it very useful in drug combinations.
Indinavir	Crixivan	Merck & Co.	U.S. patent 5,413,999	March 13, 1996	—
Nelfinavir	Viracept	Hoffmann–La Roche	U.S. patent 5,484,926	March 14, 1997	—
Amprenavir	Agenerase	GlaxoSmithKline	U.S. patent 5,585,397	April 15, 1999	The sixteenth FDA-approved antiretroviral. It was the first protease inhibitor approved for twice-a-day dosing instead of needing to be taken every eight hours. The convenient dosing came at a price, as the dose required is 1,200 mg, delivered in 8 very large gel capsules. Production was discontinued by the manufacturer December 31, 2004, as it has been superseded by fosamprenavir.
Lopinavir	Kaletra	AbbVie	U.S. patent 5,914,332	September 15, 2000	Is only marketed as a fixed-dose combination with ritonavir (see lopinavir/ritonavir). AbbVie was part of Abbott Laboratories when patent was granted.
Atazanavir	Reyataz	Bristol Myers Squibb	U.S. patent 5,849,911	June 20, 2003	Atazanavir was the first PI approved for once-daily dosing. It appears to be less likely to cause lipodystrophy and elevated cholesterol as side effects. It may also not be cross-resistant with other PIs.
Fosamprenavir	Lexiva, Telzir	GlaxoSmithKline	—	October 20, 2003	A prodrug of amprenavir. The human body metabolizes fosamprenavir in order to form amprenavir, which is the active ingredient. That metabolization increases the duration that amprenavir is available, making fosamprenavir a slow release version of amprenavir and thus reduces the number of pills required versus standard amprenavir.
Tipranavir	Aptivus	Boehringer Ingelheim	—	June 22, 2005	Also known as tipranavir disodium.
Darunavir	Prezista	Janssen Therapeutics	U.S. patent 6,248,775	June 23, 2006	As of 2016, darunavir is an OARAC recommended treatment option for treatment-naïve and treatment-experienced adults and adolescents. Several ongoing phase III trials are showing a high efficiency for the darunavir/ritonavir combination being superior to the lopinavir/ritonavir combination for first-line therapy. Darunavir is the first drug in a long time that did not come with a price increase. It leapfrogged two other approved drugs of its type, and is matching the price of a third.

== Non-antiretroviral antiviral activity ==
A drug combination targeting SARS-CoV-2, Paxlovid, was approved in December 2021 to treat COVID-19. It is a combination of nirmatrelvir, a protease inhibitor targeted to the SARS-CoV-2 3C-like protease, and ritonavir, which inhibits the metabolism of nirmatrelvir, thereby prolonging its effect.

== Side effects ==
Protease inhibitors can cause a syndrome of lipodystrophy, hyperlipidemia, diabetes mellitus type 2, and kidney stones. This lipodystrophy is colloquially known as "Crix belly", after indinavir (Crixivan).

== See also ==
- The Proteolysis Map
- Reverse-transcriptase inhibitor
- Discovery and development of NS5A inhibitors
- Discovery and development of HIV-protease inhibitors
