= Tipranavir =

Chemical compound

Clinical data
- Pronunciation: /tɪpˈrænəvɪər/ tip-RAN-ə-veer
- Trade names: Aptivus (AP-tiv-əs)
- AHFS/Drugs.com: Monograph
- MedlinePlus: a606009
- License data: EU EMA: by INN; US DailyMed: Tipranavir; US FDA: Tipranavir
- Pregnancy category: AU: B3
- Routes of administration: By mouth (soft capsules)
- ATC code: J05AE09 (WHO)

Legal status
- Legal status: UK: POM (Prescription only); US: ℞-only; EU: Rx-only

Pharmacokinetic data
- Protein binding: 99.9%
- Metabolism: Liver
- Elimination half-life: 4.8–6 hours
- Excretion: Feces (82.3%), urine (4.4%)

Identifiers
- IUPAC name: N-{3-[(1R)-1-[(2R)-6-hydroxy-4-oxo-2-(2-phenylethyl)-2-propyl-3,4-dihydro-2H-pyran-5-yl]propyl]phenyl}-5-(trifluoromethyl)pyridine-2-sulfonamide
- CAS Number: 174484-41-4
- PubChem CID: 54682461
- DrugBank: DB00932
- ChemSpider: 10482313
- UNII: ZZT404XD09
- ChEMBL: ChEMBL183041
- NIAID ChemDB: 032941
- PDB ligand: TPV (PDBe, RCSB PDB)
- CompTox Dashboard (EPA): DTXSID6048622
- ECHA InfoCard: 100.158.066

Chemical and physical data
- Formula: C_{31}H_{33}F_{3}N_{2}O_{5}S
- Molar mass: 602.67 g·mol^{−1}
- 3D model (JSmol): Interactive image
- SMILES: CCC[C@]1(CC(/O)=C(\C(=O)O1)[C@H](CC)c3cccc(NS(=O)(=O)c2ccc(cn2)C(F)(F)F)c3)CCc4ccccc4
- InChI: InChI=1S/C31H33F3N2O5S/c1-3-16-30(17-15-21-9-6-5-7-10-21)19-26(37)28(29(38)41-30)25(4-2)22-11-8-12-24(18-22)36-42(39,40)27-14-13-23(20-35-27)31(32,33)34/h5-14,18,20,25,36-37H,3-4,15-17,19H2,1-2H3/t25-,30-/m1/s1; Key:SUJUHGSWHZTSEU-FYBSXPHGSA-N

Tipranavir (TPV) is a nonpeptidic HIV-1 protease inhibitor manufactured by Boehringer Ingelheim under the trade name Aptivus. It is used as part of combination antiretroviral therapy for treatment-experienced patients with HIV-1 infection whose virus is resistant to more than one protease inhibitor. It is not approved for treatment-naïve patients.

Tipranavir can retain activity against some HIV-1 strains resistant to other protease inhibitors and is indicated for patients who are resistant to other treatments. Resistance to tipranavir itself seems to require multiple protease mutations.

The U.S. Food and Drug Administration (FDA) granted accelerated approval to tipranavir capsules on June 22, 2005. Pediatric use and the oral solution formulation were approved on June 24, 2008, for treatment-experienced pediatric and adolescent patients.

Tipranavir is administered only with ritonavir as a pharmacokinetic enhancer and in combination with other antiretroviral drugs. It is effective in salvage therapy for patients with drug resistance, but its current clinical role is limited by toxicity concerns. Side effects of tipranavir may be more severe than those of other antiretrovirals. Some side effects include intracranial hemorrhage, hepatitis, hepatic decompensation, hyperglycemia and diabetes mellitus. The drug has also been shown to cause increases in total cholesterol and triglycerides.

Aptivus labeling has a black box warning regarding hepatotoxicity and intracranial hemorrhage.

Tipranavir is currently rarely used, mainly because of intolerance, hepatotoxicity, the need for high-dose ritonavir boosting and the availability of other agents. It is no longer recommended in current guidelines except in unusual salvage contexts.
