= Fosamprenavir =

Chemical compound

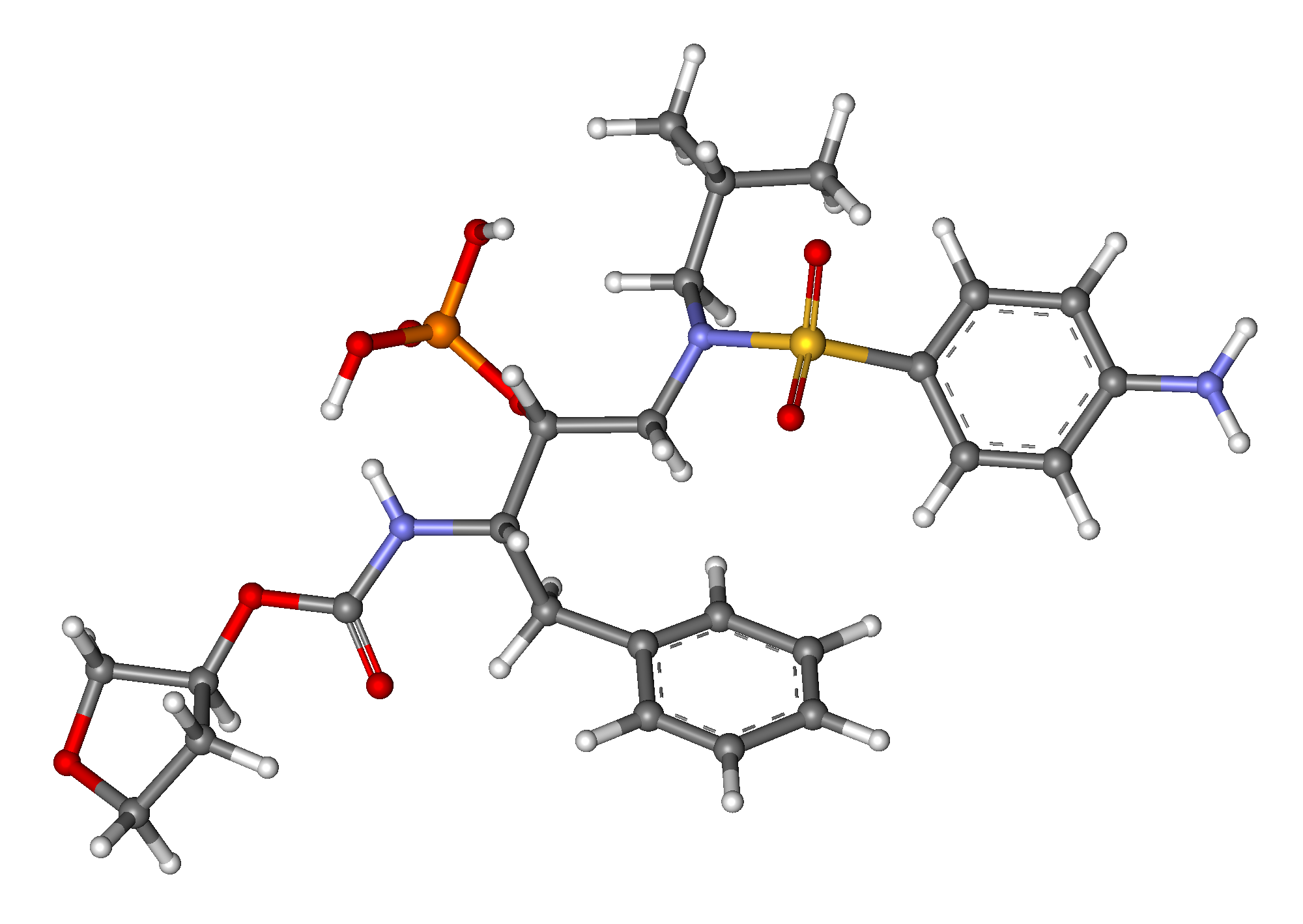

Clinical data
- Trade names: Lexiva, Telzir
- Other names: Fosamprenavir calcium (USAN US)
- AHFS/Drugs.com: Monograph
- MedlinePlus: a604012
- Pregnancy category: AU: B3
- Routes of administration: By mouth
- ATC code: J05AE07 (WHO)

Legal status
- Legal status: CA: ℞-only; UK: POM (Prescription only); US: ℞-only; EU: Rx-only

Pharmacokinetic data
- Bioavailability: Unknown
- Protein binding: 90%
- Metabolism: Hydrolysed to amprenavir and phosphate in GI tract epithelium
- Elimination half-life: 7.7 hours
- Excretion: Fecal (as metabolites of amprenavir)

Identifiers
- IUPAC name: {[(2R,3S)-1-[N-(2-methylpropyl)(4-aminobenzene)sulfonamido]-3-({[(3S)-oxolan-3-yloxy]carbonyl}amino)-4-phenylbutan-2-yl]oxy}phosphonic acid
- CAS Number: 226700-79-4; as salt: 226700-81-8
- PubChem CID: 131536; as salt: 131535
- DrugBank: DB01319; as salt: DBSALT001228
- ChemSpider: 116245; as salt: 116244
- UNII: WOU1621EEG; as salt: ID1GU2627N
- KEGG: D02497; as salt: D03835
- ChEBI: CHEBI:82941
- ChEMBL: ChEMBL1664; as salt: ChEMBL1200734
- NIAID ChemDB: 082186
- CompTox Dashboard (EPA): DTXSID2048296

Chemical and physical data
- Formula: C_{25}H_{36}N_{3}O_{9}PS
- Molar mass: 585.61 g·mol^{−1}
- 3D model (JSmol): Interactive image
- SMILES: O=C(O[C@H]1CCOC1)N[C@@H](Cc2ccccc2)[C@H](OP(=O)(O)O)CN(CC(C)C)S(=O)(=O)c3ccc(N)cc3
- InChI: InChI=1S/C25H36N3O9PS/c1-18(2)15-28(39(33,34)22-10-8-20(26)9-11-22)16-24(37-38(30,31)32)23(14-19-6-4-3-5-7-19)27-25(29)36-21-12-13-35-17-21/h3-11,18,21,23-24H,12-17,26H2,1-2H3,(H,27,29)(H2,30,31,32)/t21-,23-,24+/m0/s1; Key:MLBVMOWEQCZNCC-OEMFJLHTSA-N; as salt: InChI=1S/C25H36N3O9PS.Ca/c1-18(2)15-28(39(33,34)22-10-8-20(26)9-11-22)16-24(37-38(30,31)32)23(14-19-6-4-3-5-7-19)27-25(29)36-21-12-13-35-17-21;/h3-11,18,21,23-24H,12-17,26H2,1-2H3,(H,27,29)(H2,30,31,32);/q;+2/p-2/t21-,23-,24+;/m0./s1; Key:PMDQGYMGQKTCSX-HQROKSDRSA-L

Fosamprenavir (FPV), sold under the brand names Lexiva and Telzir, is a medication used to treat HIV/AIDS. It is a prodrug of the protease inhibitor and antiretroviral drug amprenavir. It is marketed by ViiV Healthcare as the calcium salt.

Fosamprenavir was approved for medical use in the United States in October 2003, and in the European Union in July 2004. The human body metabolizes fosamprenavir in order to form amprenavir, which is the active ingredient.

A head-to-head study with lopinavir showed the two drugs to have comparable potency, but patients on fosamprenavir tended to have a higher serum cholesterol.

In August 2026, the FDA withdrew approval of the branded fosamprenavir product (Lexiva) at the request of ViiV Healthcare after the company notified the agency that the drug was no longer marketed. Generic fosamprenavir tablets remain available in the U.S.

== Medical uses ==
Fosamprenavir is used for the treatment of HIV-1 infections, typically but not necessarily in combination with low-dose ritonavir or other antiviral drugs.

== Adverse effects ==
The most common adverse effect is diarrhea. Other common side effects include headache, dizziness and exanthema, which is usually transient. Severe allergic reactions (Stevens–Johnson syndrome) are rare.

== Interactions ==
Amprenavir (the active metabolite of fosamprenavir, which is found in blood plasma, liver and other organs) is metabolized via the liver enzyme CYP3A4 and also weakly inhibits this enzyme. This means that combination with drugs that are also metabolized by CYP3A4 can increase their plasma concentrations and thus side effects; and combination with drugs that inhibit CYP3A4 can increase amprenavir concentrations.

When combining fosamprenavir with low doses of the CYP3A4 inhibitor ritonavir, this interaction is intended as it allows for application of lower fosamprenavir doses.

== Pharmacology ==
Fosamprenavir is quickly activated to amprenavir, even before it reaches the circulation. Amprenavir is a HIV protease inhibitor.

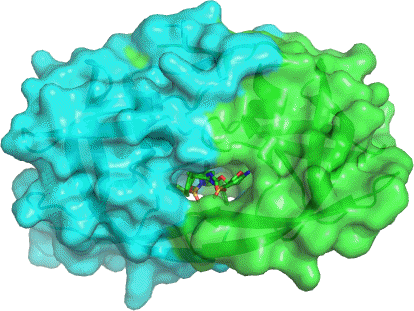
HIV-1 protease dimer with amprenavir (sticks) bound in the active site. PDB entry 3nu3
