= Indinavir =

Pharmaceutical compound

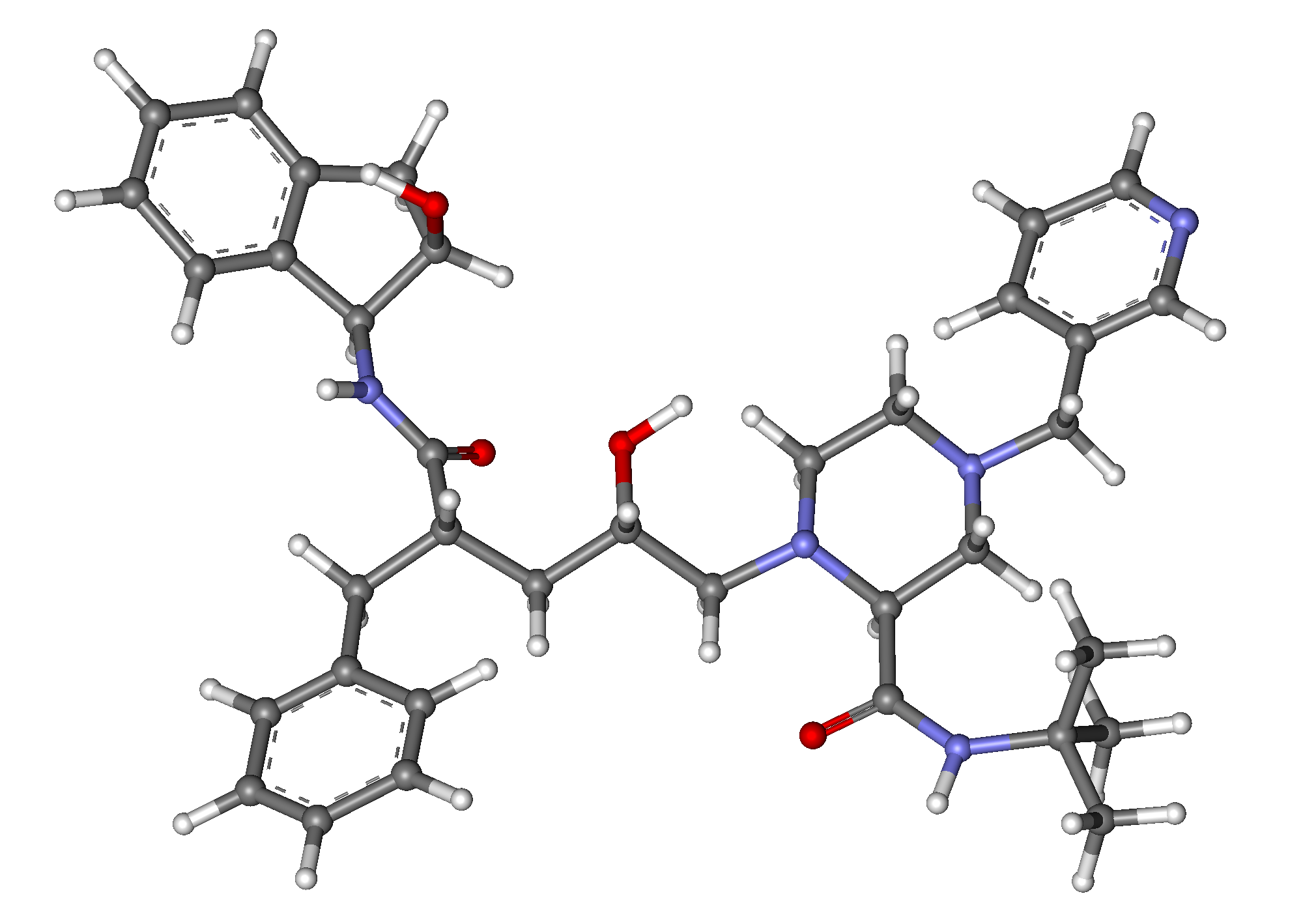

Clinical data
- Trade names: Crixivan
- AHFS/Drugs.com: Monograph
- MedlinePlus: a696028
- License data: US FDA: Indinavir
- Routes of administration: Oral
- ATC code: J05AE02 (WHO)

Pharmacokinetic data
- Bioavailability: ~65%
- Protein binding: 60%
- Metabolism: Hepatic via CYP3A4
- Elimination half-life: 1.8 ± 0.4 hours

Identifiers
- IUPAC name: (2S)-1-[(2S,4R)-4-benzyl-2-hydroxy-4-{[(1S,2R)-2-hydroxy-2,3-dihydro-1H-inden-1-yl]carbamoyl}butyl]-N-tert-butyl-4-(pyridin-3-ylmethyl)piperazine-2-carboxamide
- CAS Number: 150378-17-9
- PubChem CID: 5362440
- DrugBank: DB00224
- ChemSpider: 4515036
- UNII: 9MG78X43ZT
- KEGG: C07051
- ChEBI: CHEBI:44032
- ChEMBL: ChEMBL540914
- NIAID ChemDB: 005824
- PDB ligand: MK1 (PDBe, RCSB PDB)
- CompTox Dashboard (EPA): DTXSID4043802

Chemical and physical data
- Formula: C_{36}H_{47}N_{5}O_{4}
- Molar mass: 613.803 g·mol^{−1}
- 3D model (JSmol): Interactive image
- SMILES: CC(C)(C)NC(=O)[C@@H]1CN(CCN1C[C@H](C[C@@H](Cc2ccccc2)C(=O)N[C@H]3c4ccccc4C[C@H]3O)O)Cc5cccnc5
- InChI: InChI=1S/C36H47N5O4/c1-36(2,3)39-35(45)31-24-40(22-26-12-9-15-37-21-26)16-17-41(31)23-29(42)19-28(18-25-10-5-4-6-11-25)34(44)38-33-30-14-8-7-13-27(30)20-32(33)43/h4-15,21,28-29,31-33,42-43H,16-20,22-24H2,1-3H3,(H,38,44)(H,39,45)/t28-,29+,31+,32-,33+/m1/s1; Key:CBVCZFGXHXORBI-PXQQMZJSSA-N

Indinavir (IDV; trade name Crixivan, made by Merck) is a protease inhibitor used as a component of highly active antiretroviral therapy to treat HIV/AIDS. It is soluble white powder administered orally in combination with other antiviral drugs. The drug prevents protease from functioning normally. Consequently, HIV viruses cannot reproduce, causing a decrease in the viral load. Commercially sold indinavir is indinavir anhydrous, which is indinavir with an additional amine in the hydroxyethylene backbone. This enhances its solubility and oral bioavailability, making it easier for users to intake. It was synthetically produced for the purpose of inhibiting the protease in the HIV virus.

It is no longer recommended for use in HIV/AIDS treatment due to its side effects. Furthermore, it is controversial for many reasons starting from its development to its usage.

It was patented in 1991 and approved for medical use in 1996, on March 13 by the United States Food and Drug Administration, on October 1 by the Australian Therapeutic Goods Administration and on October 4 by the European Medicines Agency.

== Medical uses ==
Indinavir does not cure HIV/AIDS, but it can extend the length of a person's life for several years by slowing the progression of the disease. The type that is widely used and created by Merck is indinavir sulfate. The pills are created from sulfate salts and are sold in dosages of 100, 200, 333, and 400 mg of indinavir. It is normally used as one of the three drugs in a triple-combination therapy for the HIV virus.

Commercially available capsules should be stored at 15 – 30 °C. It should be kept in a tight container so that it is kept away from moisture. Therefore, it is advised that users should keep the pills in the manufacturer-provided bottle and do not remove the desiccant.

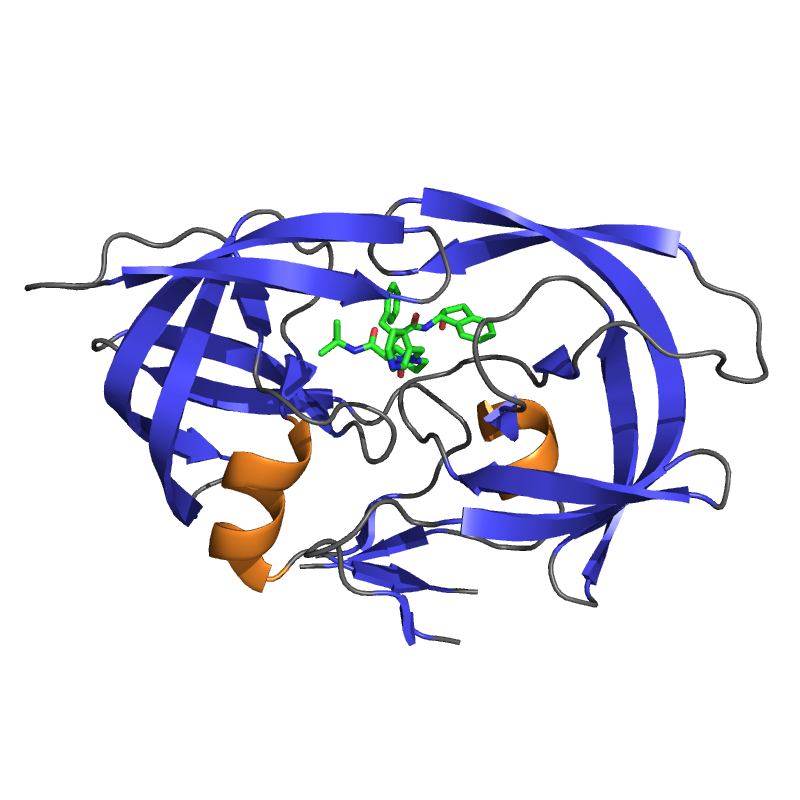
HIV-1 protease in complex with indinavir. PDB entry 2avo

Indinavir wears off quickly after dosing. Unboosted indinavir requires a very precise dosing of 800 mg every eight hours to thwart HIV from forming drug-resistant mutations, including resistances to other protease inhibitors. Boosted indinavir requires two 400-mg indinavir capsules with 1 to 2 100-mg ritonavir capsules twice a day. In both cases, the drugs must be taken with plenty of water one or two hours after a meal. It is recommended that users drink at least 1.5 liters a day when intaking the drug. Drug users must significantly increase their water intake due to indinavir's low solubility that can cause it to crystallize. There are restrictions on what sorts of food may be eaten concurrently with the unboosted indinavir treatment. Furthermore, it is no longer recommended to use in the United States for initial treatments due to pill burden and risk of kidney stones.

=== Viral resistance ===
Many people were skeptical of being too hopeful with indinavir due to previous events that occurred with AZT. Viral resistance to the drug leads to the drug becoming useless since the virus evolves to have an enzyme that is able to resist the protease inhibitor. In order to avoid this as much as possible, it is important for users to consistently take the exact amount of the drug at the allocated times. This fear of viral resistance caused a lot of users to be wary of the drug.

== Side effects ==
The most common side effects of indinavir include:

- Gastrointestinal disturbances (abdominal pain, diarrhea, nausea, vomiting)
- General malaise and fatigue
- Nephrolithiasis/urolithiasis (the formation of kidney stones), which sometimes may lead to more severe condition including kidney failure
- Metabolic alterations including hyperlipidemia (cholesterol or triglyceride elevations) and hyperglycemia
- Alterations in body shape (lipodystrophy), colloquially known as "Crix belly"
- Increased levels of Bilirubin, causing skin and white parts of the eyes to turn yellow
- Inhibits urinary nitrous oxide production and may inhibit nitric oxide production.
- Renal abnormalities, sterile leukocyturia, and reduced creatinine clearance.
- Impairs endothelial function in healthy HIV-negative men and may accelerate atherosclerotic disease.

== Chemical properties ==
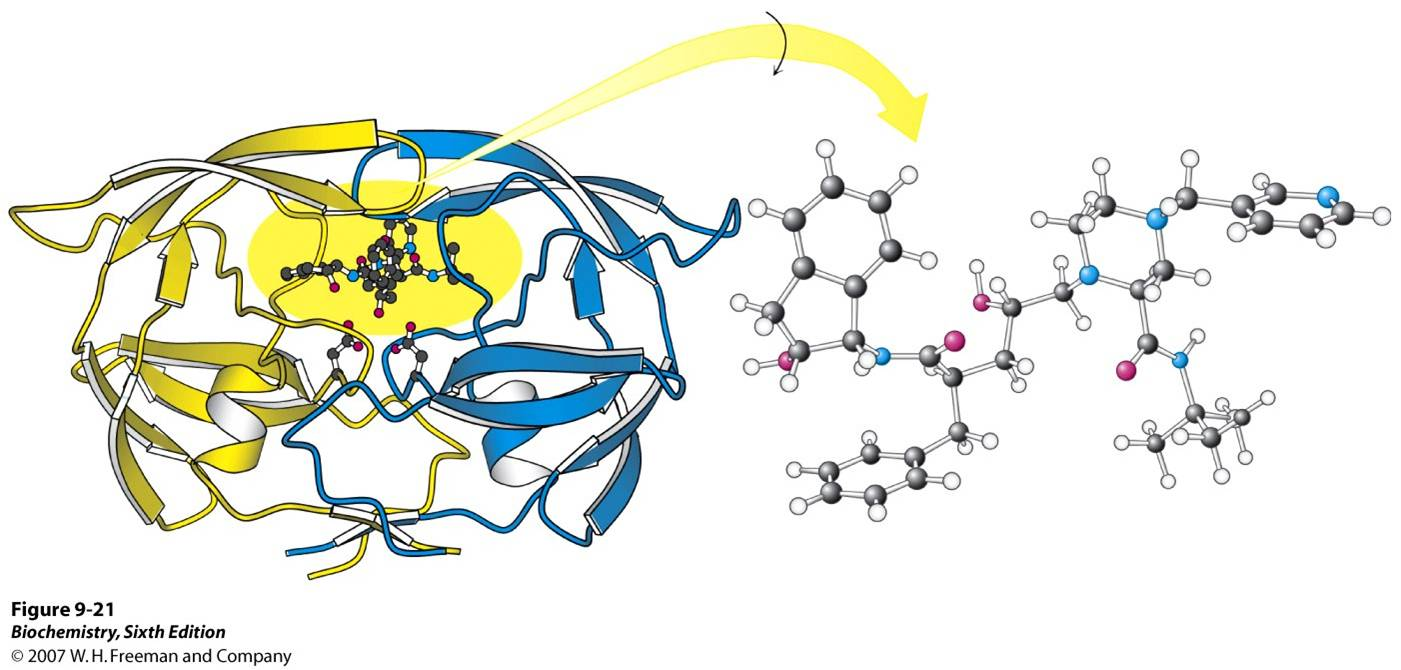
Structure of protease and indinavir

Indinavir is a white crystalline powder. It is very soluble in water and methanol. Each capsule contains sulfate salt in addition to anhydrous lactose and magnesium stearate. The capsule shell is made of gelatin and titanium dioxide. Its melting point or its temperature of decomposition is 150 – 153 °C at which it starts to emit toxic vapors such as nitrogen oxides and sulfur oxides.

The drug fits inside the protease, stopping it from functioning normally. As a result, structural proteins, resulting from polypeptide products of gag and gag-pol genes, cannot form. These structural proteins are necessary for the synthesis of new HIV virions. Eventually, the viral load decreases because of the lack of reproduction.

== History ==
The official start to its development started in December 1986 when Merck's president, Edward Scolnick, announced that they would start a comprehensive AIDS research program. They started a laboratory dedicated to AIDS research in West Point, Pennsylvania and placed Emilio Emini in charge of the laboratory. A couple months later in January 1987, a team of researchers consisting of Emilio Emini, Joel Huff, and Irving Sigal, kickstarted their studies by basing their project off of earlier research on the protease enzyme, renin. They were the ones who started the process of research and development into protease inhibitors and its relation to the virus. Over a year later, in July 1988, Nancy Kohl, Emilio Emini, et al., published in the Proceedings of the National Academy of the Science about the idea of inhibiting the protease. In February 1989, Manuela Navia, Paula Fitzgerald, et al., published a paper that showed the three-dimensional structure of HIV's protease enzyme. Other researchers claim that this study helped determine the future trajectory of the development of the inhibitor. After much research, in March 1990, researchers under Reider received a patent to synthesize part of L-689, 502 compound. These were similar to existing inhibitors. However, it failed safety assessments because of its toxicity.

Seeing that the research on their drug was heading in the direction of eventually getting it on the market, Merck decided to formulate a community advisory board composed of AIDS activists who would help with the development effort of the drug in March 1991. Later on, Merck faced serious backlash from community members who though did not like the pricing and distribution of the drug.

In January 1992, researchers synthesized indinavir sulfate (Crixivan), which was assigned compound number L-735,524. They started to test L-735,524 on animals a couple months later and found that it was safe for animals. Consequently, the company decided that it was safe to start human trials on September of the same year. Bruce D. Dorsey, James P. Guare, Joseph P. Vacca, M. Katherine Holloway and Randall W. Hungate were named inventors of the year by the Intellectual Property Owners for Crixivan.

The Food and Drug Administration (FDA) approved indinavir in March 1996, making it the eighth antiretroviral drug approved. It was first given its blessing by the FDA on March 1 then approved merely 42 days after the company filed the drug to the FDA. A major reason for this fast approval was the presentation Merck gave to the committee with results from Study 035 (see below). The fact that they had fast approval ran into trouble with groups like Treatment Action Group who thought that accelerated drug approval was not beneficial for people infected with HIV/AIDS.

From then on, indinavir used with dual NRTIs set a new standard for treatment of HIV/AIDS. Protease inhibitors changed the nature of AIDS from a terminal illness to a somewhat manageable one. It significantly increased life expectancies and decreased noticeable symptoms from infectious diseases that were the result of a weakened immune system from the virus. Currently, it is being replaced by newer drugs that are more convenient to take, less likely to promote virus resistance, and less toxic, such as darunavir or atazanavir.

== Clinical trials ==
In January 1996, Merck & Co. proved that indinavir was a clinically efficient drug based on data from human trials. They were able to show that indinavir, when used with two other anti-HIV drugs, could significantly reduce the HIV viral load.

=== Study 035 ===
The study's goal was to show the different effects of different antiviral treatments. 97 patients were randomly assigned to one of the three groups: indinavir monotherapy, AZT and lamivudine, or all three agents. Eligible patients were those who received AZT for at least 6 months and have CD4 cell counts between 50 and 400, viral loads of at least 200,000 copies/mL, and had no prior antiretroviral therapy with protease inhibitor or lamivudine.

The results of the study showed that the most effective treatment was the three drug treatment. After 24 weeks of treatment, 24 patients of the 28 patients who were treated with the three drugs were able to have viral load levels have less than 500 copies/ml. 12 out of 28 patients under indinavir monotherapy reached 500 copies/ml, and none of the thirty patients in AZT and lamivudine group got below 500 copies.

=== ACTG 320 ===
This study took a look at clinical efficiency of the different treatments. Patients had to have CD4 cell counts less than 200 and at least 3 months of AZT therapy before the trials. 1156 patients with a mean of 87 CD4 cell counts and mean viral load of 100,000 copies/ml were randomized to one of the two groups: AZT plus lamivudine or AZT plus lamivudine plus indinavir. Just like Study 035, patients couldn't be in the study if they had prior protease inhibitor treatment or lamivudine for more than one week. The end point of the study was death or development of opportunistic infections.

After 38 weeks, 6% of the people in the three-drug group died while 11% of the people died in the two-drug group. There were higher CD4 cell counts and less viral load in patients assigned to the three-drug group, proving that a three-drug treatment is more efficient than a two-drug one.

== Controversy ==
=== Supply ===
Merck did not have enough time to prepare enough drugs to distribute for all those who were infected. 650,000 to 900,000 people were infected with the virus, and Merck could only provide drugs for about 25,000 to 30,000 people. Furthermore, the drug has to be taken consistently or else users face dangers, meaning that the company has to take into account refills for users who take the drugs. This situation of limited supply caused a lot of activists to be angry at the fact that they were selling in such limited quantities.

=== Distribution ===
Because of its limited supply, Merck decided to adopt a single distributor system in which they would send indinavir to only one pharmaceutical retail company. They sold it to Stadtalnder's Pharmacy and limited quantities to Veteran Administration's hospitals and some managed-care organizations. This caused prices to be raised and limited the number of people who could have access to this possibly life-saving drug.

=== Price ===
Indinavir cost about $12 for a daily dose, which is 24% less than Invirase and 33% less than Norvir. Because the company used a single distributor system to sell their drugs, the retail price was marked up 37% by the pharmacy that sold it. In response to this hefty price, Merck stated that it cost a lot to research and develop the drug, and they did not have enough supplies to sell it through a normal distributor system. Activists protested against this price because it made it harder for people to have access to the drug.
