= Viral load monitoring for HIV =

Regular measurement of the viral load of HIV-positive people

Viral load monitoring for HIV is the regular measurement of the viral load of individual HIV-positive people as part of their personal plan for treatment of HIV/AIDS. A count of the viral load is routine before the start of HIV treatment.

== Types ==
Various viral load tests might be used. One way to classify tests is by whether it is a nucleic acid test or non-nucleic acid test. Variation in cost and the time it takes to get a result may be factors in selecting the type of test used.

== Uses ==
Viral load monitoring is used by HIV-positive people to develop a plan for their personal treatment of HIV/AIDS.

A count of the viral load is routine before the start of HIV treatment. If the treatment is not changed, then viral load is monitored with testing every 3–4 months to confirm a stable low viral load. Patients who are medically stable and who have low viral load for two years may get viral load counts every 6 months instead of 3. If a viral load count is not stable or sufficiently low, then that might be a reason to modify the HIV treatment. If HIV treatment is changed, then the viral load should be tested 2–8 weeks later.

=== Typical interpretation of results ===
Previous treatment guidelines recommended that anyone with a viral load greater than 100,000 copies/mL of blood should begin treatment. It is now standard of care in the United States to begin anti-retroviral treatment upon discovery of HIV positive status. HIV is a retrovirus, an RNA virus that enters a host cell and uses the host DNA replication machinery and the enzyme reverse transcriptase to produce DNA from the viral RNA genome. HIV also produces an integrase enzyme which is used to integrate the newly produced viral DNA into the host's DNA. The virus is then replicated every time the host cell's DNA replicates. Due to the nature of the virus the drugs used to treat HIV are called antiretroviral medicines, and the course of treatment is called antiretroviral therapy (ART). These potent medicines cannot cure an individual; they can however manage the virus and slow the progression of the HIV infection. Strict compliance with the prescribed ART regimen is vital to controlling the disease.

Highly active antiretroviral therapy (HAART) is the current recommended treatment for HIV. HAART entails taking a combination (regimen) of three or more ART medications from at least two different classes of drugs. There are six classes of ART medications:

- non-nucleoside reverse transcriptase inhibitors (NNRTIs)
- Nucleoside reverse transcriptase inhibitors (NRTIs)
- protease inhibitors (PIs)
- entry inhibitors
- Fusion inhibitors
- Integrase inhibitors

Each class of medications uses a different mode of action to blocks the virus. Treatment is more effective in controlling the virus when a combination of medications from different classes is used. HAART also reduces the risk of developing drug resistance. Viral load tests are used to monitor the effects ART, to track viral suppression, and detect treatment failure. Successful combination ART should give a fall in viral load of 1.5 to 2 logs (30-100 fold) within six weeks, with the viral load falling below the limit of detection within four to six months.

Laboratory monitoring schedule for patients using ART:

	Initial Physician visit	Prior to beginning ART	Beginning or modifying ART	2 – 8 weeks after beginning or modifying ART	Every 3 – 6 months	Every 6 – 12 months	Other
Viral load	When entering into care	Every 3 – 6 months	Baseline for comparison	Repeat every 4 – 8 weeks until viral load is suppressed to <200 copies/mL blood, then every 3 – 6 months	Individuals with a suppressed viral load, who are clinically & immunologically stable for more than 2 – 3 years, may go to every 6 months		Treatment failure or when clinically indicated
CD4	When entering into care	Every 3 – 6 months	Baseline for comparison		Routine monitoring	Individuals with a suppressed viral load, who are clinically stable, CD4 count monitoring may go to every 6 – 12 months	Treatment failure or when clinically indicated

=== CD4 count indication ===
Viral load monitoring for HIV complements the CD4 count, which is another sort of test associated with monitoring HIV. Confusion about when to take a CD4 test is common. The results of a viral load test help determine when a CD4 count is indicated. CD4 cells are the primary target of HIV. A CD4 test quantifies Helper T cells and is often combined with viral load testing to monitor the progression of HIV. CD4 testing shows the strength of the immune system, but does not report viral activity. As established by the Centers for Disease Control and Prevention (CDC), a person with HIV and a CD4 count below 200 or a CD4 percentage below 14% is considered to have AIDS. An increased CD4 count can result from an immune response to an infection or a recent vaccination. A decreased CD4 count, in combination with higher numbers on a viral load test, indicates an increased risk of getting sick from opportunistic diseases.

=== Blips in data ===
While receiving ART some patients with undetectable viral load measurements may experience an increase in viral load, to a low level (usually below 400 copies/mL blood), and then returned to an undetectable level. These transient blips do not indicate that the virus is developing resistance to drug therapy. Blips appear to be more common in the winter, suggesting a connection with illness such as colds and influenza. Viral load blips are partially explained by various patient related factors, and thought to be relatively common. High level and sustained increases in viral load are frequently related to the development of drug resistance and/or viral mutations, and often dictate changes in ART.

=== Special populations ===
The window period for a test is the amount of time from the initial infection event until the disease can be detected. Exposure to HIV, followed by replication of the virus, may take as long as six months to reach a level detectable in many testing methods. An HIV antibody test usually detects the HIV antibodies within two to eight weeks, but can have a valid negative result for a long as 2 to 6 months after initial infection. Viral load tests can also be used to diagnose HIV infection, especially in children under 18 months born to mothers with HIV, where the presence of maternal antibodies prevents the use of antibody-based (ELISA) diagnostic tests. Pooled viral RNA testing shortens the window period to a median of 17 days (95% CI, 13-28 Days). Although it is not the standard of care to use this test for diagnosis, in communities with high HIV prevalence, this test has a significantly improved negative predictive value over 3rd and 4th generation tests for detecting acute HIV infections.

== Adverse effects ==
Safe sex practices are recommended for people with low viral load, just the same as for everyone else. Researchers have questioned whether people who are told that they have a low viral load will respond to this information by lowering their use of safe sex practices. As of 2010, further research might clarify the uncertainty around that idea.

== History ==
In January 2008, researchers from Switzerland published what would be termed the Swiss Statement, controversially arguing that HIV-positive individuals 1) on antiretroviral therapy, 2) with a viral load under 40 copies per mL, and 3) with no other sexually transmitted diseases themselves or in their partners could be assumed to not transmit the disease to healthy, HIV-negative partners. Concerns were raised that blood-based measures of HIV viral concentrations at the time might not reflect actual viral counts in semen, and thus the Statement could encourage needlessly risky sexual practices, though the Statement authors argued they had taken this into account.

On June 15, 2010, the FDA approved the first diagnostic test capable of detecting HIV antigens and HIV antibodies. The Abbott ARCHITECT HIV Ag/Ab combo test, a fourth-generation test, has an increased sensitivity for detecting infections during the acute phase (when compared to 1st and 3rd generation tests), when the immune system is still developing antibodies and the virus is replicating unchecked, and in one study, was able to detect 83% of such infections.

== Society and culture ==
A person, who may be unaware of the infection, is highly infectious during this time yet may test negative for HIV using tests that detect anti-HIV antibodies only. Although Nucleic Acid Amplification Testing NAAT is more expensive and can take a week for processing, some have argued that it may still be a preferred way to screen for HIV.

=== Contagiousness ===
The higher the viral load value, the more viral elements there are in blood and other body fluids. For example, individuals with HIV are most contagious during the earliest (acute) stages of the infection, sometimes with millions of copies of HIV per centiliter of blood. According to one estimate, the majority of transmissions among gay men in the UK occur during primary infection. This is because, at this phase, the immune response is still developing. Antibody levels against the virus during acute infection are often too low to be detected, meaning that an antibody test for a highly infectious individual can come back negative.

There is at least one documented case of an HIV-positive individual with an undetectable viral load infecting his partner. Nevertheless, two recent major studies of serodiscordant couples in which the positive partner had an undetectable viral load have found no linked transmission events despite at least some unprotected sex among the couples. HPTN 052, a third study, found one linked transmission event in a test group of 886 couples, although it is unclear whether the originally infected partner in this case had achieved an undetectable viral load at the time of transmission.

Viral load in blood corresponds imperfectly to viral load in other parts of the body. Individuals with undetectable viral loads in their blood might not have undetectable viral loads in other bodily fluids, such as semen or vaginal secretions. In one recent study, of 83 men with undetectable viral loads, 21 had very slight but not undetectable viral loads in their semen. However, it is unclear how much this actually increases transmission risk.

=== Distributors ===
==== Nucleic acid test ====
Nucleic acid tests are a typical way to measure viral load, including for HIV.

HIV NATs for viral load approved & licensed by the FDA for sale in the United States
Test name	Molecular method	Use	Approved	Manufacturer
Roche Amplicor HIV-1 Monitor Test	PCR	Viral load	3/2/1999	Roche Molecular Systems, Inc. Pleasanton, CA
NucliSens HIV-1 QT	NASBA	Viral load	11/19/2001	bioMerieux, Inc Durham, NC
Trugene HIV-1 Genotyping Kit and Open Gene DNA Sequencing System	HIV-1 Genotyping	Patient monitoring	4/24/2002	Siemens Medical Solutions Diagnostics Berkeley, CA
ViroSeq HIV-1 Genotyping System with the 3700 Genetic Analyzer	HIV-1 Genotyping	Patient monitoring	6/11/2003	Celera Diagnostics Alameda, CA
Versant HIV-1 RNA 3.0	bDNA	Patient monitoring	9/11/2002	Siemens Medical Solutions Diagnostics Berkeley, CA
Procleix Ultrio Assay	TMA (commercial variation of NASBA) The three steps to the Procleix Ultrio Assay are done in one tube. The first step is specimen preparation, the second is transcription-mediated amplification (TMA), and the third is a hybridization protection assay (HPA) using single-stranded complementary chemiluminescent labeled probes. A luminometer is used to measure the signal. The sensitivity of this assay is 98%.	Qualitative detection of HIV-1 RNA and hepatitis C virus (HCV) RNA from volunteer donors of whole blood and blood components, screen of live organ donors, and test blood specimens to screen cadaveric donors. HBV screening of individual samples and pooled samples.	10/3/2006	Gen-Probe San Diego, CA US Licence 1592 Chiron Corporation
Human Immunodeficiency Virus, Type 1 (HIV-1) Reverse Transcription (RT) Polymerase Chain Reaction (PCR) Assay	PCR	Qualitative detection of HIV-1 RNA in pools of human Source Plasma	1/31/2007	BioLife Plasma Services, L.P. Deerfield, IL US Licence 1640
Abbott RealTime HIV-1 Amplification Kit	RT-PCR The sensitivity (linear range) for this assay is 40 copies/mL to 1010 copies/mL. Two probes are used. The HIV-1 probe is labeled with a fluorescent molecule and covalently binds to the 5' end. The second probe is a short oligonucleotide with a 3' end quencher molecule attached complementary to the 5' end of the HIV-1 probe. If the HIV-1 probe finds and attaches to a HIV target the quencher molecule is released and the resulting fluorescent emission is measured. The fluorescence is proportional to the log of the amount of virus in the sample.	Quantitation of HIV-1	5/11/2007	ABBOTT Molecular, Inc Des Plaines, IL
COBAS AmpliPrep/COBAS TaqMan HIV-1 Test	PCR Uses fluorescent resonance energy transfer (FRET) to enhance its automated RT-PCR. In the FRET reaction, a donor and acceptor probe exchange excitation energy when within 1-5 base pairs (bp) on the target sequences. The energy is emitted in the form of heat or fluorescence. The probes are designed to bind 1-5 bp from each other. The energy emission is proportional to the concentration of viral particles. The linear range for this assay is 48 copies/mL of blood.	Quantitation of HIV-1	5/11/2007	Roche Molecular Systems, Inc Pleasanton, CA

==== Non-nucleic acid-based tests ====
ExaVir™ Load Version 3 from Cavidi AB is a largely manual test, which has the European regulatory approval (CE-Mark) for clinical use and is also used for viral load monitoring. Virus-associated reverse transcriptase (RT) activity is measured and can therefore detect all types and subtypes of HIV. The technology does not require sophisticated laboratories.
