= Kimberly Powers =

American epidemiologist

Kimberly A. Powers
- Education: University of North Carolina at Chapel Hill; Hamilton College
- Scientific career
- Workplaces: University of North Carolina at Chapel Hill; The University of New Mexico; Los Alamos National Laboratory
- Thesis: HIV transmission dynamics: Infectivity, sexual partnership patterns, and the role of early infection (2010)
- Doctoral advisor: Myron S. Cohen

Kimberly A. Powers is an American epidemiologist who is an associate professor of epidemiology at the UNC Gillings School of Global Public Health. She combines epidemiology, statistics and mathematical modelling to understand the transmission of infectious diseases. In 2011 her work on antiretroviral therapy for the management of human immunodeficiency virus was selected by Science as the breakthrough of the year. During the COVID-19 pandemic, Powers looked to understand the spread of SARS-CoV-2.

== Early life and education ==
As a child Powers considered becoming as physician. She eventually studied mathematics at Hamilton College and graduated in 1998. After graduating she joined a healthcare consultancy, where she was first introduced to epidemiology. She spent a year at The University of New Mexico where she studied tobacco use in the community. In 2002 she moved to Los Alamos National Laboratory, where she worked as a graduate assistant in the biophysics group. There she developed mathematical models that could describe viral transmission. She was eventually accepted as a graduate student at the University of North Carolina at Chapel Hill, where she eared a Master's in Public Health. During her second year at UNC she saw a talk from Myron S. Cohen, and became interest in the use of antiretroviral drugs to treat HIV. She remained at the University of North Carolina at Chapel Hill for her doctoral studies, where she studied the transmission dynamics of HIV in the laboratory of Cohen. During her doctoral research, Cohen realised that Powers would need formal training in epidemiology. She spent one year in the United Kingdom, studying at the London School of Hygiene & Tropical Medicine and Imperial College London. In particular, her research considered acute- and early-stage HIV infection in Lilongwe. She spent weeks at a time visiting a STD clinic in Lilongwe, where she looked to improve patient care as well as track trends in HIV transmission.

== Research and career ==
In 2010 Powers started a postdoctoral research position at the UNC Gillings School of Global Public Health. She identified that almost 40% of HIV transmission occurred before patients or physicians knew about it, meaning that treatment often started after infection had occurred. People who are unaware about their own HIV infection contribute significantly to the ongoing transmission of virus. She was awarded the University of North Carolina at Chapel Hill award for research excellence in 2011.

Powers recognised that population-level prevention of HIV would require regular testing, to detect the virus in its early stages, as well as the provision of antiretroviral drugs. Powers was part of the HPTN 052 clinical trial, and demonstrated that there was a 96% reduction in transmission in couples who had been treated with antiretroviral therapy. She looked to apply this understanding to other populations, including in the US prison community. The proportion of HIV positive Americans in the United States prison system is significant; between 5 and 7 times that of the general population.

During the COVID-19 pandemic, Powers looked to understand the spread of SARS-CoV-2 in North Carolina. She predicted that by early April cases in North Carolina would reach 4,000. Her prediction was proved correct, even without people in North Carolina having access widespread testing. Her mathematical model included estimates of the rate at which people interact, and was adapted to take into account quarantine restrictions and social distancing.

== Selected publications ==
- Powers, Kimberly A; Poole, Charles; Pettifor, Audrey E; Cohen, Myron S (2008-09-01). "Rethinking the heterosexual infectivity of HIV-1: a systematic review and meta-analysis". The Lancet Infectious Diseases. 8 (9): 553–563. doi:10.1016/S1473-3099(08)70156-7. ISSN 1473-3099. PMC 2744983. PMID 18684670.
- Pilcher, Christopher D.; Joaki, George; Hoffman, Irving F.; Martinson, Francis E.A.; Mapanje, Clement; Stewart, Paul W.; Powers, Kimberly A.; Galvin, Shannon; Chilongozi, David; Gama, Syze; Price, Matthew A. (2007-08-20). "Amplified transmission of HIV-1: comparison of HIV-1 concentrations in semen and blood during acute and chronic infection". AIDS. 21 (13): 1723–1730. doi:10.1097/QAD.0b013e3281532c82. ISSN 0269-9370. PMC 2673564. PMID 17690570.
- Powers, Kimberly A; Ghani, Azra C; Miller, William C; Hoffman, Irving F; Pettifor, Audrey E; Kamanga, Gift; Martinson, Francis EA; Cohen, Myron S (2011-07-16). "The role of acute and early HIV infection in the spread of HIV and implications for transmission prevention strategies in Lilongwe, Malawi: a modelling study". The Lancet. 378 (9787): 256–268. doi:10.1016/S0140-6736(11)60842-8. ISSN 0140-6736. PMC 3274419. PMID 21684591.
