= Undetectable = Untransmittable =

HIV/AIDS prevention message

Undetectable = Untransmittable (U=U) is a health-education message used in HIV campaigns. It means that if an HIV-positive person has an undetectable HIV viral load, they cannot sexually transmit HIV to others. U=U is supported by numerous health groups and organisations worldwide, including the World Health Organization. The validity of U=U has been proven through many clinical trials involving thousands of couples. U=U is also an important concept in HIV prevention. This approach to HIV prevention is known as treatment as prevention.

== Origins ==
U=U was first used in early 2016 by the Prevention Access Campaign, based on a scientific consensus statement. The aim of the message was to change what it means to live with HIV by raising awareness and dismantling the stigma around HIV, improving the quality of life of those living with it in order to end the epidemic.

== International organisations ==
1100 organizations in 105 countries have committed to spreading the U=U message in their communities as part of a Prevention Access initiative. This has created an alliance of people living with HIV, researchers, and social organizations whose goal is, on the one hand, to end the epidemic of HIV infection, as well as the stigma related to living with HIV. For this, the campaign sought to bring scientific information closer through a language of disclosure so that all people, regardless of their training, ethnicity or socioeconomic level, can learn about the new advances.

=== Actions ===
In 2015, Bruce Richman founded the Prevention Access Campaign with the aim of connecting activists and researchers from around the world to spread the message of U=U, which has been carried out since 2016. It has received the support of numerous organizations all over the world:

- The Fight Against AIDS Foundation has declared its support for the U=U consensus statement issued by the Prevention Access Campaign stating that "the scientific evidence is clear and unequivocal: effective treatment reduces the risk of HIV transmission to zero".
- The International Council of AIDS Service Organizations (ICASO) is a community dedicated to monitoring and updating regarding issues related to U=U in women living with HIV.
- UNAIDS has carried out a series of campaigns with the aim of spreading the message, based on reports but also supporting the activities of other civil associations aimed at promoting the message.
- For World AIDS Day 2019, Fundación Huésped has carried out a campaign that includes ten measures to end HIV in Argentina: "Put on the ribbon". One of the measures says to "Promote the concept of undetectable = untransmittable (U=U)".
- The Positive Cycle Association has carried the slogan U=U as a flag since its founding in 2018, carrying out numerous activities with the aim of guaranteeing its visibility. Among them talks-debate with figures such as Gabriela Turck, CONICET researcher on issues related to reservoirs and the cure of HIV; or activities with the community such as the one carried out during the 2019 pride march that has had the support and collaboration of UNAIDS.

== See also ==
- Treatment as prevention
- Swiss statement
- Discrimination against people with HIV/AIDS
- Joint United Nations Programme on HIV/AIDS
- HIV remission
