= CDC classification system for HIV infection =

Medical classification for HIV/AIDS

The CDC classification system for HIV infection is the medical classification system used by the United States Centers for Disease Control and Prevention (CDC) to classify HIV disease and infection for surveillance purposes. The system is used to allow the government to handle epidemic statistics and define who receives US government assistance. The definition in current use was published in 2014 and replaced the separate definitions for adults and adolescents and for children that had been in use since 1993 and 1994 and revised in 2008.

== 2014 surveillance case definition ==
In 2014 the CDC and the Council of State and Territorial Epidemiologists published a revised surveillance case definition that combined the previously separate case definitions for adults and adolescents and for children into a single definition covering persons of all ages. A confirmed case is classified as stage 0, 1, 2 or 3, or as stage unknown.

Stage 0 indicates early HIV infection, and is inferred from a sequence of discordant test results in which a negative or indeterminate HIV test result was obtained within 180 days of the first confirmed positive result. The criteria for stage 0 supersede those used for the other stages; after 180 days have elapsed, a case is classified as stage 1, 2 or 3.

Stages 1 to 3 are based primarily on the CD4+ T-lymphocyte count, which takes precedence over the CD4+ T-lymphocyte percentage; the percentage is used only when the count is missing. The thresholds vary with age.

CD4+ T-lymphocyte criteria for HIV infection stages, 2014 case definition
Stage	Age <1 year		Age 1–5 years		Age ≥6 years	
Stage	Cells/μL	%	Cells/μL	%	Cells/μL	%
1	≥1,500	≥34	≥1,000	≥30	≥500	≥26
2	750–1,499	26–33	500–999	22–29	200–499	14–25
3	<750	<26	<500	<22	<200	<14

A case is also classified as stage 3 (AIDS) if a stage-3-defining opportunistic illness from a list given in the definition has been diagnosed, regardless of the CD4+ count. The 2014 revision removed the earlier requirement to distinguish between definitive and presumptive diagnoses of these illnesses. Cases for which no information on the CD4+ count or percentage is available, and for which no stage-3-defining opportunistic illness has been documented, are classified as stage unknown.

== Earlier classification systems ==
=== Adults and adolescents (1987 and 1993) ===
In 1993, the CDC added pulmonary tuberculosis, recurrent pneumonia, and invasive cervical cancer to the list of clinical conditions in the AIDS surveillance case definition published in 1987, and expanded the AIDS surveillance case definition to include all HIV-infected persons with CD4+ T-lymphocyte counts of less than 200 cells/μL or a CD4+ percentage of less than 14. Considerable variation exists in the relative risk of death following different AIDS-defining clinical conditions.

Under the 1993 definition, a person had AIDS if they were infected with HIV and presented with one of the following:

- A CD4+ T-cell count below 200 cells/μL (or a CD4+ T-cell percentage of total lymphocytes of less than 14%)

OR

- one of the following defining illnesses:
  - Candidiasis of bronchi, trachea, or lungs
  - Candidiasis esophageal
  - Cervical cancer (invasive)
  - Coccidioidomycosis, disseminated or extrapulmonary
  - Cryptococcosis, extrapulmonary
  - Cryptosporidiosis, chronic intestinal for longer than 1 month
  - Cytomegalovirus disease (other than liver, spleen or lymph nodes)
  - Encephalopathy (HIV-related)
  - Herpes simplex: chronic ulcer(s) (for more than 1 month); or bronchitis, pneumonitis, or esophagitis
  - Histoplasmosis, disseminated or extrapulmonary
  - Isosporiasis, chronic intestinal (for more than 1 month)
  - Kaposi's sarcoma
  - Lymphoma Burkitt's, immunoblastic or primary brain
  - Mycobacterium avium complex
  - Mycobacterium, other species, disseminated or extrapulmonary
  - Pneumocystis carinii pneumonia
  - Pneumonia (recurrent)
  - Progressive multifocal leukoencephalopathy
  - Salmonella sepsis (recurrent)
  - Toxoplasmosis of the brain
  - Tuberculosis
  - Wasting syndrome due to HIV

People who are not infected with HIV may also develop these conditions; this does not mean they have AIDS. Under the 1993 definition, when an individual presented laboratory evidence against HIV infection, a diagnosis of AIDS was ruled out unless the patient had:

- undergone high-dose corticoid therapy or other immunosuppressive/cytotoxic therapy in the three months before the onset of the indicator disease
- OR been diagnosed with Hodgkin's disease, non-Hodgkin's lymphoma, lymphocytic leukemia, multiple myeloma, or any cancer of lymphoreticular or histiocytic tissue, or angioimmunoblastic lymphoadenopathy
- OR a genetic immunodeficiency syndrome atypical of HIV infection, such as one involving hypogamma globulinemia

AND

- the individual had Pneumocystis carinii pneumonia
- OR one of the above defining illnesses AND a CD4+ T-cell count below 200 cells/μL (or a CD4+ T-cell percentage of total lymphocytes of less than 14%).

=== Children (1994) ===
Because of the additional knowledge of the progression of HIV disease among children, a revised classification system for HIV infection in children was developed in 1994 that replaced the pediatric HIV classification system published in 1987. A child for the purposes of the CDC was an individual of less than 13 years of age. Standard anti-HIV IgG antibody tests cannot be used to reliably indicate a child's infection status before 18 months of age, so viral antigen tests are used.

In that system, HIV-infected children were classified into mutually exclusive categories according to three parameters:

a) infection status

b) clinical status

c) immunologic status

The classification system reflected the stage of the child's disease, established mutually exclusive classification categories, and sought to balance simplicity and medical accuracy in the classification process. The same document also described revised pediatric definitions for two acquired immunodeficiency syndrome-defining conditions.

When an infant is born to an HIV-infected mother, diagnosis of an HIV infection is complicated by the presence of maternal anti-HIV IgG antibody, which crosses the placenta to the fetus. Virtually all children born to HIV-infected mothers are HIV-antibody positive at birth, although at the time the definition was written only 15–30% were actually infected.

==== Category N: Not symptomatic ====
Children who have no signs or symptoms considered to be the result of HIV infection or who have only one of the conditions listed in Category A.

==== Category A: Mildly symptomatic ====
Children with two or more of the conditions listed below but none of the conditions listed in Categories B and C:

- Lymphadenopathy (>=0.5 cm at more than two sites; bilateral = one site)
- Hepatomegaly
- Splenomegaly
- Dermatitis
- Parotitis
- Recurrent or persistent upper respiratory infection, sinusitis, or otitis media

==== Category B: Moderately symptomatic ====
Children who have symptomatic conditions other than those listed for Category A or C that are attributed to HIV infection. Examples of conditions in clinical Category B include but are not limited to:

- Anemia (<8 g/dL), neutropenia (<1,000/mm^{3}), or thrombocytopenia (<100,000/mm^{3}) persisting for at least 30 days
- Bacterial meningitis, pneumonia, or sepsis (single episode)
- Candidiasis, oropharyngeal (thrush), persisting for more than 2 months in children over 6 months of age
- Cardiomyopathy
- Cytomegalovirus infection, with onset before 1 month of age
- Diarrhea, recurrent or chronic
- Hepatitis
- Herpes simplex virus (HSV) stomatitis, recurrent (more than two episodes within 1 year)
- HSV bronchitis, pneumonitis, or esophagitis with onset before 1 month of age
- Herpes zoster (shingles) involving at least two distinct episodes or more than one dermatome
- Leiomyosarcoma
- Lymphoid interstitial pneumonia (LIP) or pulmonary lymphoid hyperplasia complex
- Nephropathy
- Nocardiosis
- Persistent fever (lasting more than 1 month)
- Toxoplasmosis, onset before 1 month of age
- Varicella, disseminated (complicated chickenpox)

==== Category C: Severely symptomatic ====
Children with any of the following conditions:

- Serious bacterial infections, multiple or recurrent (i.e., any combination of at least two culture-confirmed infections within a 2-year period), of the following types: sepsis, pneumonia, meningitis, bone or joint infection, or abscess of an internal organ or body cavity (excluding otitis media, superficial skin or mucosal abscesses, and indwelling catheter-related infections)
- Candidiasis, esophageal or pulmonary (bronchi, trachea, lungs)
- Coccidioidomycosis, disseminated (at site other than or in addition to lungs or cervical or hilar lymph nodes)
- Cryptococcosis, extrapulmonary
- Cryptosporidiosis or isosporiasis with diarrhea persisting more than 1 month
- Cytomegalovirus disease with onset of symptoms at age over 1 month (at a site other than liver, spleen, or lymph nodes)
- Encephalopathy (at least one of the following progressive findings present for at least 2 months in the absence of a concurrent illness other than HIV infection that could explain the findings): a) failure to attain or loss of developmental milestones or loss of intellectual ability, verified by standard developmental scale or neuropsychological tests; b) impaired brain growth or acquired microcephaly demonstrated by head circumference measurements or brain atrophy demonstrated by computerized tomography or magnetic resonance imaging (serial imaging is required for children under 2 years of age); c) acquired symmetric motor deficit manifested by two or more of the following: paresis, pathologic reflexes, ataxia, or gait disturbance
- Herpes simplex virus infection causing a mucocutaneous ulcer that persists for more than 1 month; or bronchitis, pneumonitis, or esophagitis for any duration affecting a child over 1 month of age
- Histoplasmosis, disseminated (at a site other than or in addition to lungs or cervical or hilar lymph nodes)
- Kaposi's sarcoma
- Lymphoma, primary, in brain
- Lymphoma, small, noncleaved cell (Burkitt's), or immunoblastic or large cell lymphoma of B-cell or unknown immunologic phenotype
- Mycobacterium tuberculosis, disseminated or extrapulmonary
- Mycobacterium, other species or unidentified species, disseminated (at a site other than or in addition to lungs, skin, or cervical or hilar lymph nodes)
- Mycobacterium avium complex or Mycobacterium kansasii, disseminated (at site other than or in addition to lungs, skin, or cervical or hilar lymph nodes)
- Pneumocystis carinii pneumonia
- Progressive multifocal leukoencephalopathy
- Salmonella (nontyphoid) sepsis, recurrent
- Toxoplasmosis of the brain with onset at greater than 1 month of age
- Wasting syndrome in the absence of a concurrent illness other than HIV infection that could explain the following findings: a) persistent weight loss more than 10% of baseline OR b) downward crossing of at least two of the following percentile lines on the weight-for-age chart (e.g., 95th, 75th, 50th, 25th, 5th) in a child at least 1 year of age OR c) less than the 5th percentile on weight-for-height chart on two consecutive measurements at least 30 days apart PLUS a) chronic diarrhea (i.e., at least two loose stools per day for more than 30 days) OR b) documented fever (for at least 30 days, intermittent or constant)

=== 2008 revision ===
A revision published in 2008 required laboratory-confirmed evidence of HIV infection for all reported cases, replaced the 1993 clinical categories A, B and C with stages 1, 2 and 3 (AIDS) plus a stage of "unknown", and provided a separate definition for children aged under 18 months and for those aged 18 months to under 13 years.

== See also ==
- WHO disease staging system for HIV infection and disease
- Diagnosis of HIV/AIDS
