= Myron S. Cohen =

American physician-scientist

- Born: Myron Scott Cohen; 7 May 1950 (age 76); Chicago, Illinois
- Education: University of Illinois Urbana-Champaign; Rush Medical College; University of Michigan; Yale University
- Known for: HIV Prevention Trials Network 052 study
- Scientific career
- Fields: HIV, Medicine, Epidemiology
- Workplaces: University of North Carolina at Chapel Hill; HIV Prevention Trials Network
- Doctoral students: Kimberly Powers

Myron Scott Cohen (born May 7, 1950, in Chicago, Illinois) is an American physician-scientist who has made substantial contributions to our understanding of the transmission prevention of transmission of HIV. He is best known as chief architect of HIV Prevention Trials Network 052, a large-scale randomized clinical trial which demonstrated proof-of-concept for “treatment as prevention”: treating an HIV-infected person with antiviral drugs makes them less contagious and prevents transmission to their sexual partners. Cohen is J. Herbert Bate Distinguished Professor of Medicine, Microbiology and Immunology, and Epidemiology at the University of North Carolina at Chapel Hill. He is also co-chair of the National Institutes of Health's HIV Prevention Trials Network.

== Education ==
Cohen graduated from James H. Bowen High School in Chicago, and earned a bachelor of science degree at the University of Illinois Urbana-Champaign. He received his M.D. degree from Rush Medical College of Rush University Medical Center in Chicago and did residency training in internal medicine at the University of Michigan. He completed an infectious disease fellowship at Yale University. Cohen joined the faculty of the University of North Carolina at Chapel Hill in 1980.

== Research ==
Cohen was among the first to outline the role of STD co-infections in the sexual transmission of HIV.

Not long after the first FDA-approved drug treatment for HIV/AIDS, AZT, appeared in 1987, Cohen began studying the effect of this and later drugs on the amount of virus in genital secretions. This led to the idea that people taking these drugs might be less contagious. In 2005 Cohen launched a clinical study, known as HPTN 052, of 1,763 couples where only one person is HIV-infected. The results indicated that early antiviral therapy reduced sexual transmission by at least 96 per cent. Michel Sidibé, executive director of UNAIDS, called it a “game-changer,” The Economist speculated on “The End of AIDS,” and treatment as prevention became a central part of global HIV/AIDS prevention strategy.

In December 2011, Science magazine, named treatment as prevention and HPTN 052 the scientific ‘Breakthrough of the Year.’ Its editor Bruce Alberts said “The [HPTN 052] results have galvanized efforts to end the world’s AIDS epidemic in a way that would have been inconceivable even a year ago.”

== Memberships ==
Cohen is a fellow of the American College of Physicians, the Infectious Diseases Society of America and the American Society for Microbiology. In 2012 he was elected to the Institute of Medicine. He serves as an editor of the journal Sexually Transmitted Diseases

== Selected Awards and Honors ==
- 2015 Commencement Address, University of North Carolina School of Medicine
- 2012 Fall Commencement Address, University of North Carolina at Chapel Hill
- 2012 Tar Heel of the Year, Raleigh News & Observer
- 2012 Healthcare Heroes Lifetime Achievement Award, Triangle Business Journal
- 2012 Top 10 Clinical Research Achievement Award, Clinical Research Forum
- 2011 Hope is a Vaccine Award, GAIA
- 2008 O. Max Gardner Award, University of North Carolina System
- 2005 Thomas Parran Award, American Sexually Transmitted Diseases Association

== Selected publications ==
1. Royce AR, Seña A, Cates W and Cohen MS (1997). Sexual transmission of HIV. N Engl J Med 336: 1072-1078.
2. Vernazza PL, Gilliam BL, Dyer J, Fiscus SA, Eron JJ, Frank AC, and Cohen MS. Quantification of HIV in semen: Correlation with antiviral treatment and immune status (1997). AIDS 11:987-993.
3. Cohen MS, Hoffman IF, Royce RA, Kazembe P, Dyer JR, Zimba D, Vernazza PL, Costello-Daly C, Maida M, Fiscus SA, and Eron JJ (1997). Reduction of Concentration of HIV-1 in semen after treatment of urethritis: Implications for prevention of sexual transmission of HIV-1. Lancet 349:1868-1873.
4. Pereira AS, Kashuba ADM, Fiscus SA, Hall JE, Tidwell RR, Troiani L, Dunn JA, Eron JJ, Cohen MS (1999). Antiretroviral therapy and HIV-1 in semen: relationship between drug concentration and viral burden. J Infect Dis 180 (6):2039-43,
5. Chakraborty H, Sen PK, Helms RW, Vernazza PL, Fiscus SA, Eron JJ, Patterson BK, Coombs RW, Krieger JN, Cohen MS (2001). Viral burden in genital secretions determines male-to-female sexual transmission of HIV-1: A probabilistic empiric model. AIDS 15:621-627.
6. Cohen MS, Gay C, Kashuba AD, Blower S, and Paxton L (2007). Narrative Review: antiretroviral therapy to prevent the sexual transmission of HIV-1. Ann Intern Med 146: 591-601
7. Cohen MS, Chen YQ, McCauley M, Gamble T, Hosseinipour MC, Kumarasamy N, Hakim JG, Kumwenda J, Grinsztejn B, Pilotto JH, Godbole SV, Mehendale S, Chariyalertsak S, Santos BR, Mayer KH, Hoffman IF, Eshleman SH, Piwowar-Manning E, Wang L, Makhema J, Mills LA, de Bruyn G, Sanne I, Eron J, Gallant J, Havlir D, Swindells S, Ribaudo H, Elharrar V, Burns D, Taha TE, Nielsen-Saines K, Celentano D, Essex M, Fleming TR; the HPTN 052 Study Team (2011). Prevention of HIV-1 infection with early antiretroviral therapy. New Eng J Med. 363: 493-505.
8. Padian NS, McCoy SI, Karim SS, Hasen N, Kim J, Bartos M, Katabira E, Bertozzi SM, Schwartländer B, Cohen MS (2011). HIV prevention transformed: the new prevention research. Lancet 378: 269-78.
9. Powers KA, Ghani AC, Miller WC, Hoffman IF, Pettifor AE, Kamanga G, Martinson FE, Cohen MS (2011). The role of acute and early HIV infection and implication for transmission prevention strategies in Lilongwe, Malawi: a modelling study. Lancet 378: 256-68.
10. Smith, K, Muessig, KE, Powers, KS Miller, WC and Cohen MS (2012). HIV Treatment as Prevention: The Utility and Limitations of Ecological Observation. PLoS Med. 9(7): e1001260.
