= Swiss statement =

2008 declaration on HIV contagiousness

The Swiss Statement (French: La déclaration suisse; German: das EKAF-Statement), or the Swiss Consensus Statement, was an announcement published in January 2008 by the Swiss Federal Commission for AIDS/HIV (German: Eidgenössischen Kommission für Aids-Fragen, EKAF) (Note: The official Swiss government translation is Federal Commission for AIDS-related Issues. As of 2020, the Commission is called the Federal Commission for Issues relating to Sexually Transmitted Infections (German: Eidgenössische Kommission für Fragen zu sexuell übertragbaren Infektionen, EKSI).) outlining the conditions under which an HIV-positive individual could be considered functionally noncontagious: with adherence to antiretroviral therapy, a sufficiently low viral load, and a lack of any other sexually transmitted diseases. While at the time lacking the backing of complete, fully randomized clinical studies, the Commission felt the existing evidence for non-contagiousness for people on antiretroviral treatment was nonetheless strong enough to warrant official publication.

The Statement generated significant controversy, with some defending it as based on adequate existing scientific evidence and as beneficial for people with HIV, and others maintaining that it was misleading and possibly encouraged risky sexual practices.

In the years following its publication, further studies validated the Statement. The Statement now represents a medical consensus on the transmission of HIV.

== Background ==
Ongoing clinical research on serodiscordant couples (i.e. those with different HIV status) in the mid-2000s had produced evidence that antiretroviral therapy regimes could be sufficient to suppress HIV viral load such that ART patients would not transmit the disease, even without practicing safe sex.

== Statement and controversy ==
The statement listed three specific conditions under which an HIV-positive individual can be considered noncontagious to an HIV-negative sexual partner. These conditions are:

"(1) the HIV-infected patient is receiving antiretroviral therapy with excellent adherence;
(2) blood viral load has consistently been undetectable (<40 copies per mL [a measure of viral load] for more than 6 months); and
(3) no STDs are present in either of the partners."

The statement generated controversy among the medical community; while not representing completely novel research, many were concerned with the implications for public health at large, as it might imply condoms were unnecessary. Concerns were also raised that blood-based measures of HIV viral concentrations might not reflect actual viral counts in semen, a view that Vernazza said that EKAF took into account when crafting the statement.

In response to the Swiss Statement, both the World Health Organization and the United States Centers for Disease Control and Prevention reiterated their recommendations that condoms should always be used by HIV-positive individuals during sex. Dr. Anthony Fauci, then-director of the US National Institute of Allergy and Infectious Diseases, noted that "[t]he phenomenon of lower virus, less chance of transmission is well known," but that he and other health authorities were still concerned with "making the statement that there is essentially no risk of getting infected if you are having sex with a partner who is HIV-positive and on ARVs [antiretrovirals] with virus below detectable levels. There is no such thing as zero risk."

Research by Wilson et al. published later in 2008 argued that while the risk of HIV transmission was very low among heterosexual couples meeting the three conditions of the Swiss Statement, it was still non-zero. Based on mathematical modeling of 10,000 hypothetical heterosexual, serodiscordant couples, risk of HIV transmission could be as high as 60% per year; for homosexual partnerships, the rate could be even higher. Thus, they argued, "If the claim of non-infectiousness in effectively treated patients was widely accepted, and condom use subsequently declined, then there is the potential for substantial increases in HIV incidence." Vernazza et al., the authors of the Swiss Statement, countered that the modeled 60% chance of infection did not comport with any available empirical data and that condom use had a similar rate of transmission in the Wilson et al. study.

== Further developments ==
The findings of the Swiss Statement became scientific consensus in the 2010s. The HPTN 052 study published in 2011 and the PARTNER study published in 2014 further validated the Statement's argument.

== See also ==
- Treatment as prevention
- HPTN 052
