= WHO disease staging system for HIV infection and disease =

Medical classification for HIV/AIDS

WHO Disease Staging System for HIV Infection and Disease was first produced in 1990 by the World Health Organization and updated in 2007. It is an approach for use in resource limited settings and is widely used in Africa and Asia and has been a useful research tool in studies of progression to symptomatic HIV disease. Most of these conditions are opportunistic infections that are easily treated in healthy people. The staging system is different for adults and adolescents and children.

Stage I: HIV disease is asymptomatic and not categorized as AIDS.

Stage II: include minor mucocutaneous manifestations and recurrent upper respiratory tract infections.

Stage III: includes unexplained chronic diarrhea for longer than a month, severe bacterial infections and pulmonary tuberculosis.

Stage IV: includes toxoplasmosis of the brain, candidiasis of the esophagus, trachea, bronchi or lungs and Kaposi's sarcoma; these diseases are used as indicators of AIDS.
