= Treatment as prevention =

Technique by which HIV medication can prevent transmission

Treatment as prevention (TasP) is a concept in public health that promotes treatment as a way to prevent and reduce the likelihood of HIV illness, death and transmission from an infected individual to others. Expanding access to earlier HIV diagnosis and treatment as a means to address the global epidemic by preventing illness, death and transmission was first proposed in 2000 by Garnett et al. The term is often used to talk about treating people that are currently living with human immunodeficiency virus (HIV) and acquired immune deficiency syndrome (AIDS) to prevent illness, death and transmission. Although some experts narrow this to only include preventing infections, treatment prevents illnesses such as tuberculosis and has been shown to prevent death. In relation to HIV, antiretroviral therapy (ART) is a three or more drug combination therapy that is used to decrease the viral load, or the measured amount of virus, in an infected individual. Such medications are used as a preventative for infected individuals to not only spread the HIV virus to their negative partners but also improve their current health to increase their lifespans. When taken correctly, ART is able to diminish the presence of the HIV virus in the bodily fluids of an infected person to a level of undetectability. Consistent adherence to an ARV regimen, monitoring, and testing are essential for continued confirmed viral suppression. Treatment as prevention rose to great prominence in 2011, as part of the HPTN 052 study, which shed light on the benefits of early treatment for HIV positive individuals.

Evidence through observational, ecological and clinical trials reveal positive results in regards to the implementation of antiretroviral drugs as preventative measures against HIV transmission. Progress in scaling up access to treatment is brisk, and as of 2023 there are over 29 million people receiving antiretroviral therapy. Challenges to scaling access to treatment include cost and drug resistance.

TasP's legitimacy has influenced the World Health Organization's (WHO) 2015 shift from "test and wait" to "test and treat" recommendation, focusing on alerting as many people as possible of their HIV status through testing and starting them on ART treatment, regardless of their viral load or CD4 count. The diminished rate of new HIV infections brought about by these strategies are marked progress towards UNAIDS' 90-90-90 and 95-95-95 target to eliminate HIV/AIDS as a public health crisis by 2030. However, key populations in countries in Africa, Asia, and the Middle East may still have lower access to treatment. Understanding whether marginalized groups have access to testing and treatment are often hampered by harsh laws that do not allow for the accurate collection of data regarding these communities. Estimates of the number of people who are men who have sex with men, female sex workers, and/or drug users are very difficult to ascertain, rendering understanding diagnosis and access to treatment levels also difficult to determine.

TasP and test and treat to maximize access to early treatment is now the global standard for HIV prevention.

== HIV Prevention Trials Network clinical trial 052 ==
Early work by Quinn in Uganda demonstrated that transmission was reduced by over 90% when people living with HIV were on treatment and virally suppressed. Observational evidence accumulated and the Attia meta analysis supported the 2008 Swiss Statement that said that those suppressed on treatment had little or no chance of transmission. Many experts, citing the Bradford Hill criteria, accepted this observational data. However, others called for randomized control trials.

The HIV Prevention Trials Network conducted a clinical trial, HPTN 052, that analyzed the effectiveness of antiretroviral drugs on the HIV-1 virus. 1,783 HIV sero-discordant couples, or couples that consist of an HIV-positive individual and an HIV-negative partner, from nine countries were a part of the study, 97% of the couples being heterosexual. In August 2011, the HIV Prevention Trials Network concluded that the likelihood of transmission between the couples who were provided early antiretroviral therapy reduced by 96%. When the trial completed, the overall reduction percentage of HIV-1 transmission between couples who were treated early with ART or received the delay-ART treatment was 93%. The study's purpose was to reveal that HIV-1 viral transmission can be prevented through treatment, leading many regions to incorporate a treatment as prevention plan into their public health policy for responding to HIV.

== Implementation ==
Treatment as prevention has been used as a form of controlling the spread of HIV since the mid-1990s, initially in the context of preventing the transmission of the virus from mothers to their children. Research in 1994 revealed how the drug zidovudine can reduce vertical transmission. The testing and treatment of HIV-positive mothers during pregnancy, childbirth, and breastfeeding has since led to the reduction of the risk of transmission by up to 95%. A program for offering ARVs for life to any HIV-positive pregnant woman called "Option B+" served as a precursor to the "test and treat" strategy that is now being rolled out in various countries. Assessments of the Option B+ program are able to aid in the improvement and further establishment of "test and treat".

From 2013 to 2018, the global number of people receiving ARV treatment rose by a third, and now is at 23 million people. This is a result of increased use of "test and treat". In 2015, about one fourth of the 148 countries informed about national treatment plans had initiated the WHO's "test and treat" approaches, and 44 more countries pledged to implement them by the end of 2016. The five-year HPTN 071 "PopART" study is currently examining the efficacy of TasP in 21 communities throughout South Africa and Zambia. PopART is focused on the advantages and downfalls of providing free voluntary HIV testing in combination with instant treatment for those who test positive. This study has a scope of about 1 million residents, making it the largest executed test of "test and treat".

== Challenges and risks associated with Treatment as Prevention ==
While TasP has a huge potential to prevent the further spread of HIV worldwide, the major barrier to implementing TasP is lack of political will. Specifically, estimates suggest that only around 60% of all resources for HIV go towards ensuring diagnosis and treatment while the rest is spent on other priorities. In some African countries multiple billions of dollars have been allocated with some only achieving 60-70% ART coverage. Global HIV control priorities often include 90-90-90 and 95-95-95 (proxies for TasP coverage), however, TasP is often not included when calling for increased efforts in preventing and ending the epidemic. Many of the most vulnerable populations may not be seeing these benefits as a result of a social and political climate that is deterrent to seeking testing and treatment, in addition to making it difficult to stick with the ARV regimen. With this, antiretroviral therapy should be implemented within every country's public health policy, yet challenges and risks are faced when such implementation is put into action. While vulnerable populations often have difficulty accessing services, it is unknown what proportion of MSM, FSW and DUs are on ART due to uncertainties in determining estimating the numbers of people and the understandable reluctance for many people to disclose whether they are in these groups when accessing services.

=== Overall cost of treatment ===
For many countries, especially low- and middle-income countries, the overall cost of treatment in the 1990s and early 2000s was too expensive for infected patients to afford it. In addition, individuals with low incomes in United States struggle to pay high prices set by pharmaceutical companies for antiretroviral drugs. As a result, it was implausible for a global treatment system or policy to be put into place since no universal HIV/AIDS test and medication regimen existed and due to technology and wealth disparities worldwide. However, with the advent of rapid HIV testing (including self testing), viral load testing, and effective ART regimens at less than $100 per year treatment scale up (read widespread implementation of TasP) is now a reality in many settings.

=== Side effects caused by ART ===
Newer ART regimens are largely side effect free and side effects are no longer a major barrier to starting treatment. Additionally, newer regimens are almost 100% resistance free and can translate into lifelong effective therapy. In the past antiretroviral drugs can also cause patients to experience various side effects including becoming nauseated or developing gastrointestinal pains and issues, as a results of medications at times being too toxic for a specific individual. In addition, in low and middle income countries (LMICs), an increase in the number of side effects expressed in a country leads to the underdeveloped health care systems of said country having to use their limited funds to account for service delivery costs of medications to counter the newly inflicted problems among infected individuals.

=== HIV-1 drug resistance ===
HIV drug resistance has also come to the forefront of worries in regards to how effective TasP can be against the spread of the virus. The widespread global use of ARVs is feared to lead to an increase in drug resistance as a result of interrupted treatment and a lack of adherence. Despite these fears widespread resistance threatening the efficacy of ART has not emerged despite tens of millions of people being on treatment in the harshest conditions. Likewise fears of non-adherence also proved to be overblown.

Developed countries, when first discussing the implementation of ART in the developing world, believed that the allowance of third-world countries to have early access to antiretroviral drugs would potentially lead to the development of drug resistance. Recently, such resistance has developed in third-world countries as a result of medication combinations failing to diminish the viral load of HIV-1 in infected individuals, the lack of existence of virological testing to discover such failures in patients in these regions of the world and the lack of variants of medication regimens to suppress the evolution of the infection.

In the case of resistance to the first-line of combination medications for the HIV-1 virus, mutations occurred within genes of HIV-1 viral RNA that enters T-cells within the human body. Mutations are the result of reverse transcriptase, the enzyme that is responsible for reverse-transcribing the viral RNA into viral DNA, having a high error rate when copying the viral RNA. The mutations occur within the nucleotide bases of the new viral DNA.

After the mutated viral DNA is implemented into the host cell's DNA, the DNA is translated to produce viral proteins that will assist in the infecting of other surrounding cells. When translated, the mutations lead to different amino acids formulating the viral proteins. The primary proteins that are focused upon in relation to HIV-1 are the viral protease and reverse transcriptase because these enzymes are the ones that are inhibited by antiretroviral medications.

Overall, the transmitted drug resistance (TDR) among resource-limited setting (RLS) adults in regions such as Africa, Asia and Brazil has increased, the calculated rate of TDR being 6.6% as of 2015. In addition, studies that were conducted within these regions revealed a correlation between the length of time ART was implemented as a method of treatment and the likelihood of the establishment of TDR. The studies concluded that the likelihood of TDR in LMICs is 1.7 times greater if ART is implemented for equal to or more than five years.

=== Necessity for adherence ===
Antiretroviral therapy requires HIV-positive individuals to abide by strict adherence and thrives when countries have the necessary HIV services available for infected individuals to access. Management of HIV/AIDS includes services such as HIV testing and diagnosing, consistent HIV care and treatment, education lessons regarding how to use ART effectively and distribution methods to ensure individuals receive their medications. In LMICs, HIV testing has expanded, which, in turn, creates the opportunity for the initiation of treatment as a preventative method as an increasing number of infected individuals are aware of their HIV status.

== Short-term and long-term solutions ==
=== Global Fund ===
In 2002, The Global Fund to Fight AIDS, Tuberculosis and Malaria (Global Fund) was a financial initiative developed to raise and provide funding to the developing world in an attempt to enhance their care and treatment programs for individuals who are living with HIV/AIDS, TB and malaria. For the international organization to be successful, developed countries must work in conjunction with third-world countries, private organizations, civil society and affected communities to ease the impact of the epidemics. In an attempt to prevent the misuse of funding provided by the Global Fund, a system has been set in place for countries to apply for funding through submission of proposals and implementation plans. As a result of the impact of the Global Fund, seventeen and a half million people are being treated with antiretroviral therapy as of 2017.

=== PEPFAR ===
In 2003, in an attempt to promote the importance of HIV research and funding, George W. Bush enacted the President's Emergency Plan for AIDS Relief (PEPFAR/Emergency Plan), committing the United States government to authorize $15 billion to support HIV/AIDS, tuberculosis (TB) and malaria over a five-year period in third-world countries. With the improvement of ART treatment as a result of PEPFAR, the number of new infections has declined by 51-76% worldwide since the enactment of the Emergency Plan. In addition, the funding received from PEPFAR has allowed developing countries to treat millions, prevent millions of new infections and provide other care services to millions of already infected individuals.

=== Generic drugs ===
Antiretroviral generic drugs are medications that are identical to brand names drugs. Pharmaceutical companies in Brazil and India like Cipla and Farmanguinhos have dedicated their efforts to reduce the prices of ART drugs. For example, Cipla has reduced prices of antiretroviral drugs for poor third-world countries to practically zero. Through their initiatives in combination with pharmaceutical companies in Brazil, individuals in third-world countries are being provided access to antiretroviral treatment regimens that they could not afford before. Today, ART drug combinations cost $75 in Africa.

With the providing of generic drugs at such low costs in the developing world brings about turmoil regarding the current expensive prices of antiretroviral drugs in the United States. Antiretroviral drug regimens in the United States range in price from $10,000 to $40,000 as a result of pharmaceutical companies having control of price regulation. With this, the future of price reduction in the United States depends on pharmaceutical competition and negotiation to make antiretroviral drugs available to all low- and middle-income individuals despite where they may live in the world.

=== Community-based care ===
"Community-based care" refers to communities with high rates of HIV transmission and infected individuals taking the initiative to end the spread of AIDS within their own community. Community based care services include access to:

- HIV testing
- directly observed therapy with HAART (DOT-HAART)
  - DOT-HAART refers to the administration and delivery of antiretroviral drugs by community members to ensure individuals adhere to drug regimens. Such community members observe the taking of medications to provide guidance and clarify any questions infected individuals may have.
- educational services regarding HIV transmission and prevention methods
- condoms and other barrier methods
- maternal-child transmission packages
- social services for families and orphaned children
- other services to ensure suppression of HIV transmission

The utilization of community-based care assists in the efforts in diminishing HIV transmission to reduce the number of new infections annually.

There have been studies of key populations in communities like Cape Town, South Africa that assert the benefits of community-based approaches, like adherence "clubs", where participants meet every two months for group counseling and the distribution of their ARV treatments.

=== Cost-effectiveness ===
In South Africa and India, a clinical trial was completed to determine the cost-effectiveness of administering antiretroviral drugs early to treat HIV. Sero-discordant couples were used in the study and each couple was provided either early or delayed antiretroviral treatment. Over a five-year period, researchers concluded that early ART was cost-saving in South Africa and cost-effective in India. Over a lifetime, early ART was determined to be very cost-effective in both countries. After the release of such results, other countries have concluded that it is cost-effective to utilize combination therapy resources especially when implementing them early into practice.

=== Single-tablet regimens ===
When doctors prescribe antiretroviral drugs to patients, the initial prescriptions consist of drug regimens that contain multiple pills of different classes that must be taken daily. Although triple therapy is most commonly used, there are single-tablet regimens (STRs) that exist to treat AIDS. STRs are created through combining three antiretroviral drugs into one pill. Single-tablet regimens are only available at specific clinics around the world—meaning there is limited access to these regimens—and are only prescribed if a doctor feels a patient will struggle with the treatment schedule of antiretroviral therapy. The implementation of STRs worldwide could serve as a replacement for the triple-drug antiretroviral therapy and allow patients to have a less strict ART schedule to abide by.

=== Injectable HIV-1 treatment ===
The greatest struggle faced by HIV-positive individuals is maintaining compliance of taking the ART pills every day. The lack of compliance can lead to drug failure or drug resistance. In July 2017, The Lancet released an article revealing the results of a study conducted involving an injectable HIV-1 treatment to serve as a future replacement for the three-drug oral combination therapy. This new treatment would consist of two drugs: cabotegravir and rilpivirine, and injections would occur every four to eight weeks for each patient. Thus far, the treatment has passed Phase II of the clinical trial and has been proven to be just as effective as the oral regimen.

In August 2018, ViiV Healthcare, a collaboration between GlaxoSmithKline and Pfizer revealed the findings of a study that found that receiving monthly injections of two long-acting ARVs over a course of 48 weeks is just as effective as taking daily pills. However, logistical questions still remain about cost, the effect of missed shots, and side effects of taking monthly injections. The study, which is called Antiretroviral Therapy as Long-Acting Suppression (ATLAS) is experimenting with the drugs cabotegravir—made by ViiV—and rilpivrine, which is a licensed drug from Janssen Sciences Ireland UC. ATLAS has a scope of 618 HIV-positive individuals from 13 countries, all of which had reached undetectability. Half of the participants continued with daily pills, while the others switched to receiving an injection each month. Viral suppression was the same in both groups. The results of the ATLAS study may also impact those who are not yet infected and are participating in PrEP, yet are reluctant to take daily pills. Other studies are underway which are testing viral suppression in HIV-positive people who have never taken antiretrovirals, and whether the injectables are still effective when only taken once every 8 weeks. With the introduction of long-acting drugs come questions on the optimal dose and timing, and how the virus may mutate to become resistant to the new form of treatment.

== Moving forward ==
Treatment as prevention has the ability to shift the paradigm of how HIV is received and treated. The effects of universal testing and treatment, and connecting people with resources for care will allow for global effects in terms of reduced rates of new HIV infections. The success of TasP is contingent upon innovation in strategies to increase the rate of HIV testing, along with exploring other dimensions of improving adherence, such as including cognitive and emotional support in those efforts. The cost of viral load testing is another factor in TasP's longevity, and increased access to that resource will allow for greater access to the beneficial effects of treatment as prevention.
