= HPTN 052 =

Clinical trial for HIV treatment

HPTN 052 is the name of a clinical trial conducted in nine countries which examined whether starting people living with HIV on antiretroviral therapy (ART) can reduce the chance that they will pass HIV on to their sexual partners who do not have HIV. The trial showed remarkable success in preventing HIV transmission and were so compelling that the study's Data and Safety Monitoring Board (DSMB) asked the research team to share the results with all study participants and offer ART to the control group (people who had been randomized to not start ART) before the study ended. As a result of the study there was increased consensus that treatment as prevention should be included as a public health strategy in lowering HIV infection. The trial was organized by the HIV Prevention Trials Network (HPTN) and its chief architect was Myron S. Cohen.

== Results ==
As reported by a 2011 publication in the New England Journal of Medicine, in the trial there were 1763 couples, where only one partner was infected with HIV. After following them for a median of 1.7 years, there were 4 HIV infections in the group on ART and 35 in the group not on ART. However, when comparing the HIV viruses in the 4 infections in the ART group, 3 of them were different than that of the partner who had originally had HIV. It is likely that these were contracted from another sexual partner, who was not involved in the trial. Therefore, only 1 transmission was recorded in the ART group with 886 couples followed for almost 2 years. That was estimated to be a 96% reduction from the control group, who had only started on ART if they had become sick or their CD4 cell counts had dropped below 250. It is also notable that both groups had received extensive counseling, condoms, and STI treatment.

After the finding of such a drastic reduction in transmission the control arm was stopped prematurely in 2011 and all participants were offered ART. Couples were followed for four more years and by 2015, 1,171 couples were still being followed when the study was completed. As reported in a follow-up publication in the New England Journal of Medicine, only 8 cases of HIV transmission were recorded from patients on ART and 4 of them happened in the first three months after treatment was started and before the virus was able to be suppressed. The other 4 were in patients who had detectable levels of virus in their blood despite being on ART, likely due to resistance and virologic failure. Overall there was a sustained 93% reduction in HIV transmission.

== Ethics ==
This study was groundbreaking for providing compelling evidence that treating persons with HIV actually reduces HIV infection rates in communities. Now that this information is available, it has created debates about ethical obligations which communities might have when making decisions about providing HIV treatment.

== Reception ==
In December 2011, Science named the study as "Breakthrough of the Year".
