= Anand Reddi =

Global health policy and public health advocate

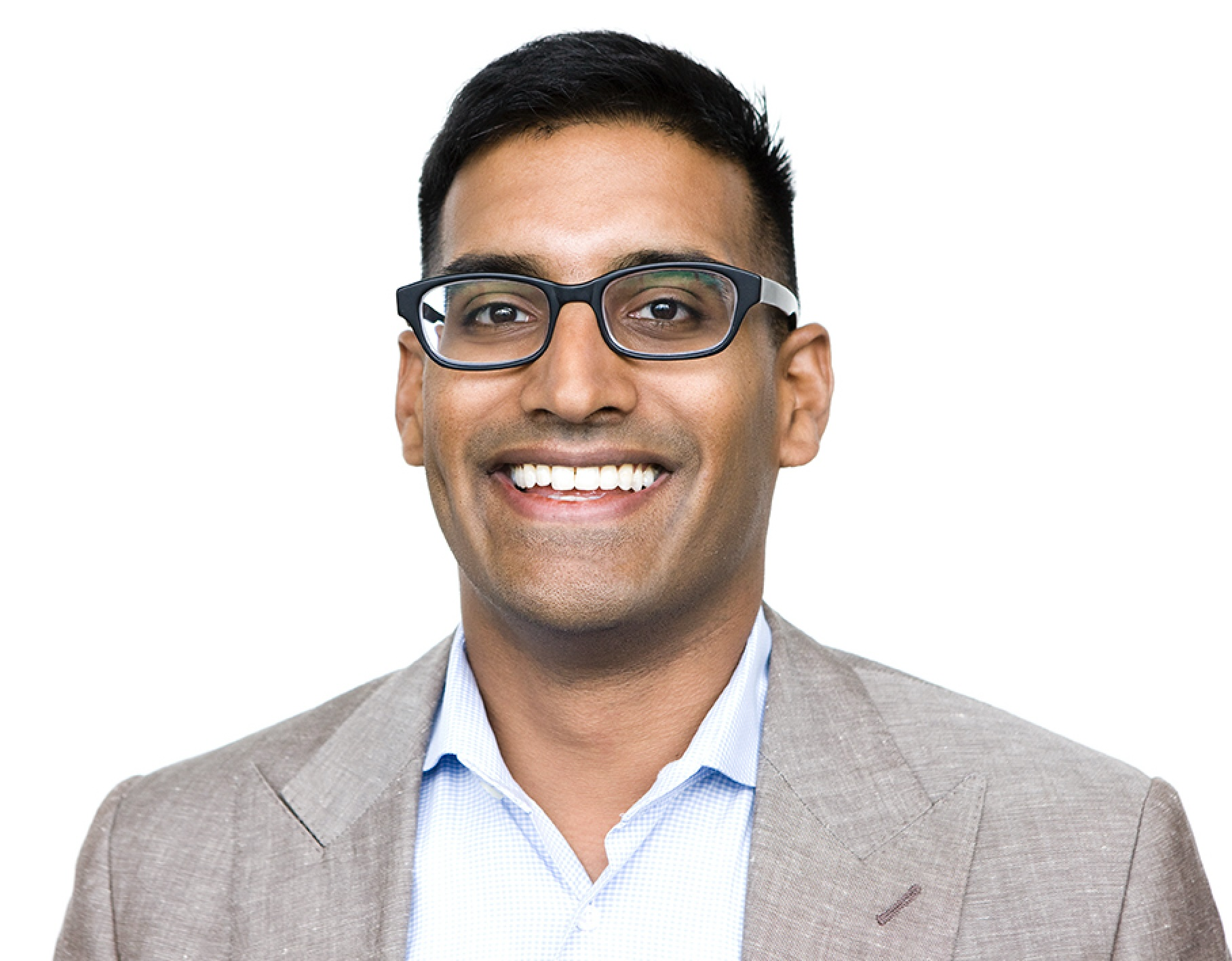
- Born: Maryland, US
- Education: University of Michigan, Ann Arbor, University of Colorado School of Medicine
- Occupations: Global health policy specialist, public health advocate, biotech executive
- Known for: Advocacy in global HIV/AIDS treatment and health systems strengthening
- Awards: Fulbright Scholar, American Medical Association Foundation Leadership Award

Anand Reddi is a global health policy expert, public health advocate and biopharma executive. Reddi works on health system strengthening initiatives with a focus on global health, implementation science, health financing and public health advocacy. A major focus of scholarship is global HIV scale-up including the President's Emergency Plan for AIDS Relief (PEPFAR). Since 2014, his focus has shifted to public-private global health partnerships to support access to essential medicines between by the biopharma private sector. He served on the board of directors of the AIDS Healthcare Foundation from 2009 to 2011 and was a founding member of the board of directors of the Bay Area Global Health Alliance.

== Early life and education ==
Reddi pursued his undergraduate studies at the University of Michigan, Ann Arbor and a medical degree at the University of Colorado School of Medicine. He was a Fulbright Scholar to KwaZulu-Natal, South Africa, focusing on pediatric antiretroviral scale-up under the research mentorship of Hoosen Coovadia at the PEPFAR funded Sinikithemba HIV/AIDS clinic at McCord Zulu Hospital.

== Global Health ==
=== HIV implementation science ===
In the early 2000s it was uncertain if the provision of antiretroviral therapy in resource limited settings such as Southern Africa was feasible. Reddi's research documented that antiretroviral therapy is effective despite the challenges of a resource limited setting. These data were important in providing implementation experience for HIV scale-up initiatives advanced by PEPFAR and The Global Fund.

=== U.S. HIV global health policy ===
In May 2009, the Obama administration's introduced a global health initiative that de-prioritized global HIV funding by prioritizing funding for maternal and child health programs. Ezekiel Emanuel, the initiative's architect and a special advisor to President Obama on health policy, argued that PEPFAR "is not the best use of international health funding" and "fails to address many of the developing world's most serious health issues." Reddi challenged Dr. Emanuel's position on PEPFAR by arguing maternal and child health need not be framed in opposition to PEPFAR. Reddi and Archbishop Desmond Tutu alongside other HIV advocates rebutted Emanuel's arguments that resulted in the restoration of $366 million for antiretroviral scale-up to Uganda in 2010. The opinion pieces in The Huffington Post, The New York Times and The Washington Post facilitated the movement to drive the Obama administrations' reversal on global HIV funding.

=== HIV pre-exposure prophylaxis access ===
The AIDS Healthcare Foundation (AHF) launched a campaign against the Food and Drug Administration review of Truvada for use as a HIV Pre-exposure Prophylaxis (PrEP) drug. Reddi resigned from the Board of Directors of AHF over their opposition to HIV PrEP writing: "AHF's media campaign against FDA review of PrEP is myopic, blinded by its determination to derail a promising new medication." The resulting advocacy was validated by the 2015 decision by the World Health Organization to recommended that people at substantial risk of HIV infection should be offered tenofovir disoproxil fumarate (TDF)-based oral PrEP as an additional HIV prevention option.

=== Human capital contracts ===
To address healthcare worker shortages in resource-limited settings, Reddi proposed using human capital contracts inspired by Nobel Prize in Economic Sciences winner Milton Friedman. Under this model, an investor—such as a donor nation, foundation, or global health initiative—would fund a student's medical training in exchange for 10 years of service in government or NGO clinics within their home country. Medical licenses would be tied to this commitment, and a multilateral agreement could curb migration during the service period to address human capital flight or "brain drain".

=== HIV Test & Treat implementation science ===
Reddi led a major HIV Test & Treat initiative in Shinyanga, Tanzania, partnering with Gilead Sciences, The Vatican, the Tanzanian government, and NGOs like Doctors with Africa CUAMM and Joep Lange's Amsterdam Institute of Global Health. The project reached over 300,000 people through decentralized outreach, linking those testing positive to care. Between May 2017 and June 2019, 255,329 HIV tests were conducted, with a positivity rate of 1.2%.

== Basic science ==
Anand Reddi has made contributions to basic science research with a focus oncology and tissue engineering. His research mentors include Martha Somerman, Roel Nusse, Len Herzenberg and Xiao-Jing Wang. The American Federation for Medical Research and Society for Clinical Investigation awarded Reddi the Edwin E. Osgood Award for his research on the molecular mechanisms of microRNAs involved in transforming growth factor beta skin squamous cell cancer tumor initiation and metastasis.

== Digital Health and AI ==
Reddi also advanced digital health tools to enhance patient access to PrEP including the development and launch of Gilead Sciences' PrEP Hub, a digital platform aimed at improving access and public health resources to HIV prevention.

== Conflict of interest disclosure in U.S. medical education ==
Transparency about faculty-industry financial relationships has become an increasingly important aspect of professionalism in academic medicine. While such disclosures are common in publications and professional meetings, they are often overlooked in the medical school setting. Anand Reddi explored the educational benefits of faculty disclosing conflicts of interest to students and led policy efforts to promote this practice. In 2011, he implemented a disclosure policy at the University of Colorado School of Medicine followed by a national initiative with the American Medical Association that resulted in the Liaison Committee on Medical Education encouraging all U.S. medical schools to adopt disclosure guidelines.

== Awards ==
Reddi received the Thomas Jefferson Award from the University of Colorado, the Atlantic Dialogues Emerging Leader Award, the American Medical Association Foundation Leadership Award and the Fulbright Scholarship to South Africa for his contributions in global health policy and HIV/AIDS treatment and advocacy.
