= Pre-exposure prophylaxis for HIV prevention =

HIV prevention strategy using preventative medication for HIV-negative individuals

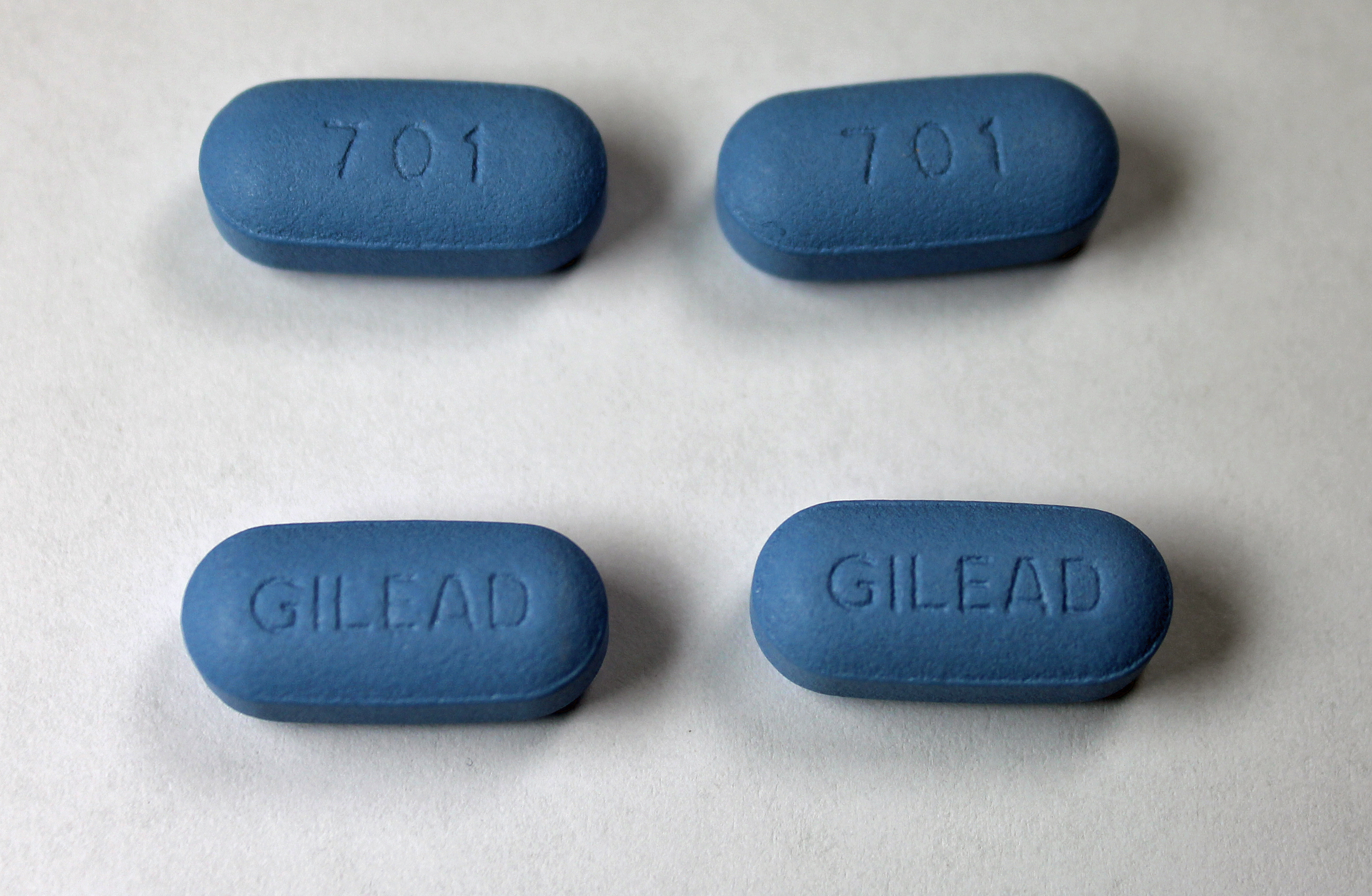
Tablets of Truvada, an emtricitabine/tenofovir combination used for HIV pre-exposure prophylaxis

Pre-exposure prophylaxis for HIV prevention, commonly known as PrEP (pronounced as prep, /prɛp/), is the use of antiviral drugs as a strategy for the prevention of HIV/AIDS by people that do not have HIV/AIDS. PrEP is one of a number of HIV prevention strategies for people who are HIV-negative but who have a higher risk of acquiring HIV, including sexually active adults who are at increased risk of contracting HIV, people who engage in intravenous drug use, and serodiscordant sexually active couples.

The first form of PrEP for HIV prevention—emtricitabine and tenofovir disoproxil (FTC/TDF; Truvada)—was approved in 2012. In October 2019, the US Food and Drug Administration (FDA) approved the combination of emtricitabine and tenofovir alafenamide (FTC/TAF; Descovy) to be used as PrEP in addition to Truvada, which provides similar levels of protection. Descovy, however, is currently approved only for cisgender men and transgender women as the efficacy has not been assessed in people at risk for HIV through receptive vaginal sex.

In December 2021, the US FDA approved cabotegravir (Apretude), which is an injectable form of PrEP manufactured by Viiv Healthcare. Regulators believe it will improve medication adherence because it has to be taken just once every two months, and it will also widen adoption as it eliminates the need to hide pills or pharmacy visits for discretion.

In its 2021 guidelines, the World Health Organization (WHO) recommends several options for PrEP, tailored to different populations and circumstances:

- Oral PrEP using TDF-containing compounds for anyone at substantial risk of HIV infection;
- Event-driven PrEP for men who have sex with men (MSM); and
- The dapivirine vaginal ring (DPV-VR) for women at substantial risk of HIV infection who do not have access to oral PrEP.

On 18 June 2025, the FDA approved the long-acting HIV prevention antiretroviral lenacapavir in the United States. The drug is branded as Yeztugo by Gilead Sciences and requires only two subcutaneous injections per year, demonstrating high efficacy in clinical trials by offering nearly complete protection against HIV infection. As the second PrEP extended-release option following cabotegravir, lenacapavir's simplified dosing schedule could significantly improve patient access and adherence, especially for populations at higher risk of HIV. However, the global rollout may be challenged by recent funding reductions by the Trump Administration in global health funding by the United States that were expected to support lenacapavir access in lower-income countries across sub-Saharan Africa by PEPFAR. In September 2025, global partnerships set lenacapavir's HIV prevention price at US$40 per patient annually in 120 low- and middle-income countries. The WHO is planning to adopt lenacapavir in global guidelines for resource-limited settings as well as for WHO pre-qualification regulatory approval.

== Medical uses ==
=== Indications for use ===
==== United States ====
In the United States, federal guidelines updated in 2021 now recommend healthcare providers discuss and provide information on the use of PrEP for HIV prevention for all sexually active adults and adolescents. The US Centers for Disease Control and Prevention (CDC) recommends providers take a targeted sexual history of their patients to assess specific risk for HIV acquisition and suggest PrEP to the following patients:

- Sexually active adults and adolescents who have had anal or vaginal sex in the past six months and any of the following:
  - One or more partner(s) with unknown HIV status and inconsistent condom use;
  - An HIV-positive sexual partner (especially if they have an unknown or detectable viral load);
  - A bacterial sexually transmitted infection (STI) in the past six months.
- Patients reporting injection drug use within the last six months and any of the following:
  - An HIV-positive injecting partner;
  - Shared injection equipment.

Additionally, these updated guidelines recommend providers prescribe PrEP to any patient that requests it, regardless of their stated risk factors.

==== United Kingdom ====
In the United Kingdom the BHIVA/BASHH guidelines on the use of HIV pre-exposure prophylaxis (PrEP) 2018 recommend:

- On-demand or daily oral tenofovir–emtricitabine (TD-FTC) for HIV-negative MSM who are at elevated risk of HIV acquisition through unprotected anal sex in the previous six months and ongoing unprotected anal sex.
- On-demand or daily oral TD-FTC for HIV-negative MSM having unprotected anal sex with partners who are HIV-positive, unless the partner has been on AntiRetroviral Therapy (ART) for at least six months and their plasma viral load is <200 copies/mL.
- Tenofovir (TDF) alone should not be offered to MSM.
- Daily oral TD-FTC for HIV-negative heterosexual men and women having unprotected sex with partners who are HIV-positive, unless the partner has been on ART for at least six months and their plasma viral load is <200 copies/mL.
- Daily oral TD-FTC for heterosexual men and women on a case-by-case basis with current factors that may put them at increased risk of HIV acquisition.
- TDF alone can be offered to heterosexual men and women where FTC is contraindicated.
- PrEP is not recommended for people who inject drugs where needle exchange and opiate substitution programs are available and accessed by the individual.
- PrEP with daily oral TD-FTC for HIV-negative trans women who are at risk of HIV acquisition through unprotected anal sex in the previous six months and ongoing unprotected sex.
- Daily oral TD-FTC for HIV-negative trans women and trans men who have unprotected sex with partners who are HIV-positive, unless the partner has been on ART for at least six months and their plasma viral load is <200 copies/mL.

==== Other countries ====
Other government health agencies from around the world have devised their own national guidelines for how to use PrEP to prevent HIV infection in those at high risk, including Botswana, Kenya, Lesotho, South Africa, Uganda, the Zambia, and Zimbabwe.

=== Eligibility, follow-up care, dosage ===
Per WHO guidelines, initiation of PrEP can be done if a person tests negative for HIV, has no signs of current HIV infection, has good kidney function (creatinine clearance >30 ml/min^{4}) and no contraindications to the medication. Once PrEP is initiated, individuals are asked to see their healthcare provider at least every three to six months. During those visits, providers should repeat testing for HIV, test for other sexually transmitted infections, monitor kidney function, and/or test for pregnancy. Individuals must test negative for HIV prior to PrEP initiation because persons infected with HIV taking PrEP medication are at risk for becoming resistant to emtricitabine. Consequently, people with HIV infection and resistance to emtricitabine will have fewer options for selecting HIV treatment medications.

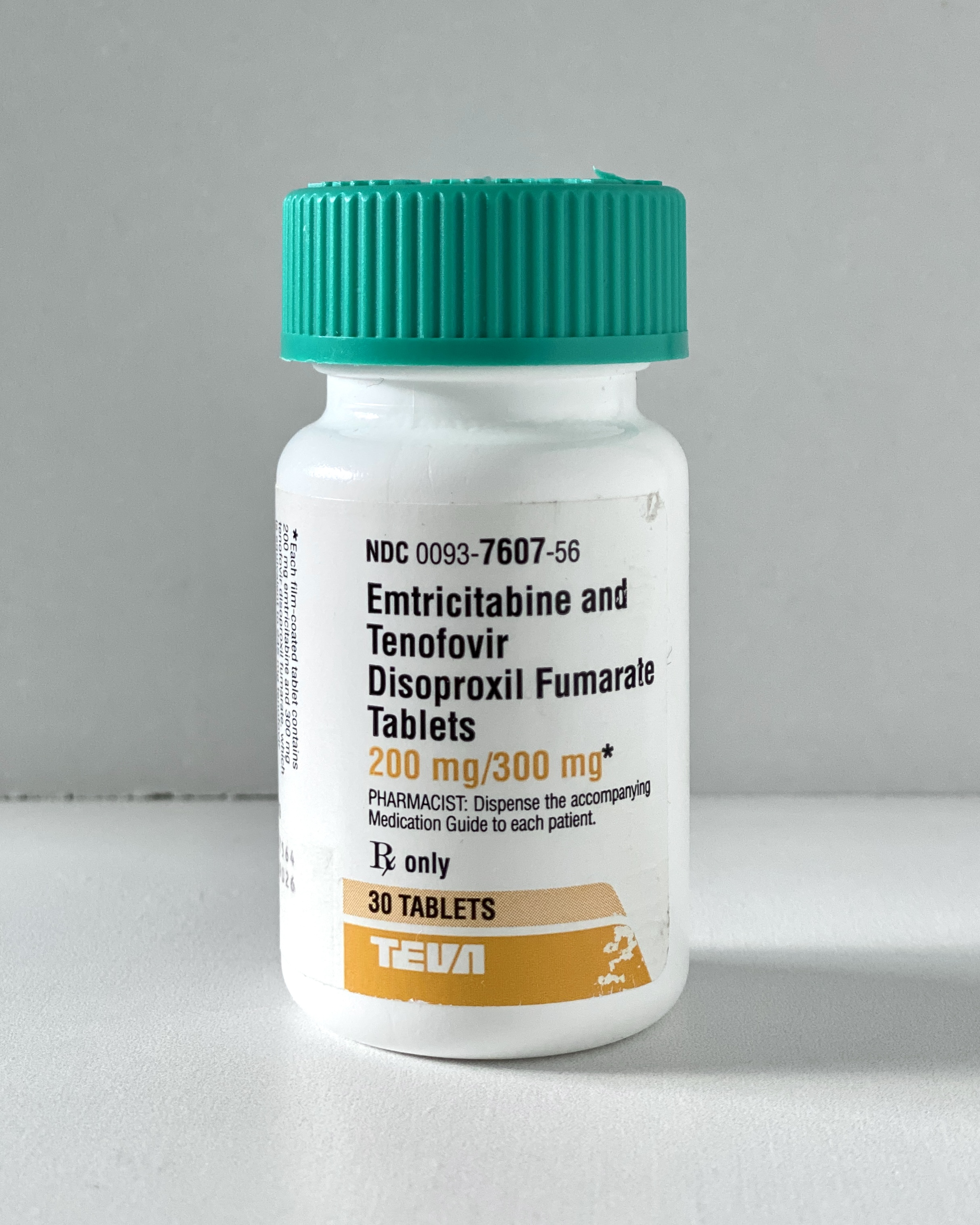
A bottle of a generic version of emtricitabine/tenofovir, used for PrEP

Oral PrEP is typically taken daily following potential exposure. The CDC recommends follow-up visits at least every three months to provide HIV tests, medication adherence counseling, behavioral risk reduction support, side effect assessment, STI symptom assessment, and STI testing for sexually active individuals with symptoms of a current infection. Pregnancy tests should also be done every three months for woman who may become pregnant. At three months and every six months thereafter, renal function and presence of bacterial STI is assessed. Effectiveness of PrEP is associated with adherence, meaning the more consistently a person takes the medication as prescribed the greater the chance at reducing their risk for HIV.

There are two injection-based PrEP methods, with different drugs, one using lenacapavir and one with cabotegravir, each with guidelines for eligibility and initiation criteria similar to those of oral PrEP medications. However, instead of daily dosing, doses are one to six months apart. Lenacapavir is injected every six months; for initiation, in addition to injection, the same drug is also taken orally at the time of injection and one day later, as a loading dose. People who use cabotegravir receive the initial dose followed by a second dose one month later; thereafter dosing is every two months. As for all HIV PrEP, follow-up testing includes repeat HIV testing and STI screening. Those who decide to discontinue injectable PrEP may begin using oral PrEP one dosing period after their last injection.

PrEP has been shown to be effective at reducing the risk of acquiring HIV in individuals at increased risk. Studies evaluating PrEP efficacy to reduce risk of HIV infection found a linear relationship between adherence and effectiveness of medication. This means that the more closely people follow recommended dosing of PrEP, the more effective the medication is at preventing infection. However, PrEP is not 100% effective at preventing HIV, even in people who take the medication as prescribed. There have been several reported cases of people who acquired HIV despite taking PrEP. People taking PrEP may use combination prevention strategies along with PrEP, such as condoms and other protective barriers methods. If someone on PrEP acquires HIV, they may experience the signs and symptoms of HIV/AIDS.

==== Event-driven PrEP ====
Although the daily, oral dosing schedule is still recommended for all individuals taking PrEP medication for HIV infection prevention, event-driven pre-exposure prophylaxis, or ED-PrEP, is an option for men who have sex with men (MSM). ED-PrEP is also referred to as "2+1+1" dosing, because the dosing regimen involves a person taking two pills two to twenty-four hours prior to sex, one pill twenty-four hours after taking the first two pills, and a last pill taken forty-eight hours after taking the first two pills. This dosing regimen was first proven effective to reduce the relative risk of HIV infection by 86% in the IPERGAY randomized clinical trial performed in Canada and France in 2015. This has only been evaluated with Truvada and not other drugs. According to the WHO, ED-PrEP should be considered for HIV infection prevention in MSM who have relatively infrequent sex, who are able to plan sex or delay sex for about two hours, and who find this dosing schedule convenient. ED-PrEP is not recommended for use in other populations, such as women and men who have sex with cisgender women, due to the lack of safety and efficacy data available. ED-PrEP can be beneficial to help reduce the pill burden for people and decrease costs, as fewer pills are needed.

==== PrEP During Pregnancy and Postpartum ====
The World Health Organization (WHO) recommendations support the use of PrEP in pregnant and breastfeeding people who are at substantial risk of HIV infection. A growing body of evidence demonstrates the safety of TDF-containing oral PrEP during pregnancy and breastfeeding. This is an important time for prevention, as acquiring HIV during pregnancy increases the risk of transmission to the infant. Global oral PrEP accessibility for women, including those who are either pregnant or breastfeeding, is limited. In addition, there is minimal research on the effects of injectable PrEP and pregnancy outcomes. Efforts to increase accessibility to women who are at risk for HIV are necessary for reducing rates of global HIV infections.

== Contraindications ==
There are currently no PrEP options approved for use in people who weigh less than 35 kg (77 lbs).

=== Truvada and Descovy ===
Truvada and Descovy are contraindicated for use as pre-exposure prophylaxis (PrEP) in individuals who have an unknown or positive HIV status. HIV-positive or -negative status must be determined before someone begins the use of either of these medications as PrEP. Additionally, any hypersensitivity or severe allergy to any ingredient, emtricitabine, tenofovir disoproxil, or tenofovir alafenamide is a contraindication for continued use of these medications.

== Side effects ==
Research shows that pre-exposure prophylaxis (PrEP) is generally safe and well tolerated for most individuals, although some side effects have been noted to occur.

Initial side effects called start-up syndrome may occur. These include nausea, abdominal pain, headaches, weight loss, and diarrhea, which generally resolve within a few weeks of starting the medication.

Research has shown that the use of Truvada has been associated with mild to moderate declines in kidney function, mostly associated with people over 50 and those with predisposing conditions such as diabetes or low glomerular filtration rates. These declines were usually of no concern, stabilized after several weeks of being on the drug, and reversed once the drug was discontinued. In addition, a meta-analysis in 2023 indicated no change in hepatic or renal function in patients using PrEP. However, some of these side effects were serious enough for several people on PrEP to file lawsuits against the makers of Truvada as well as the makers of other similar drugs.

While osteopenia, or bone loss, was reported in clinical studies, it was considered minimal and did not lead to osteoporosis. When comparing bone fractures between active participants and control groups there was no significant difference in bone fractures.

Fat redistribution and accumulation was more commonly seen in individuals receiving antiretroviral therapy, particularly with older antiretrovirals, for the treatment of HIV. No significant changes in fat redistribution or change in fat had been noted when used as a pre-exposure prophylaxis. Research and study outcome analysis suggests that emtricitabine/tenofovir does not have a significant effect on fat redistribution or accumulation when used as pre-exposure prophylaxis in HIV-negative individuals. As of early 2018, these studies have not assessed in detail subtle changes in fat distribution that may be possible with the drug when used as PrEP, and statistically significant – though transient – weight changes have been attributed to detectable drug concentrations in the body.

Other potential serious side effects of Truvada include acute exacerbations of hepatitis B in individuals with HBV infection, lactic acidosis, and severe hepatomegaly with steatosis.

Descovy research and data from public use has shown similar "start-up" effects; however, some data indicate that Descovy is better for one's kidneys and for those with a diagnosis of osteoporosis. The DISCOVER trial that compared Descovy and Truvada for PrEP showed that Descovy produced safer kidney and bone outcomes.

The earlier injectable form of PrEP, cabotegravir, has side effects similar to those of oral PrEP, such as nausea and headache. However, one of the most common side effect is pain at injection site.

=== Boxed warnings ===
Both Truvada and Descovy carry a boxed warning for the combination of emtricitabine/tenofovir, as this combination of drugs can result in the acute worsening of hepatitis B infection when discontinued. This combination of drugs is also known to increase HIV resistance to these medications when used as pre-exposure prophylaxis (PrEP) in individuals who have already (recently) been infected with HIV. Cabotegravir (Apretude) shares a similar boxed warning to only use the medication if a person tests negative for HIV infection.

== Society and culture ==
=== Access and adoption ===
In September 2025, partnerships led by the Clinton Health Access Initiative, Unitaid, and the Gates Foundation secured agreements with Indian manufacturers to provide lenacapavir for HIV prevention at US$40 per patient annually in 120 low- and middle-income countries.

Approved Under review Not approved No data

=== Approval for use ===
Truvada was previously only approved by the US Food and Drug Administration (FDA) to treat HIV in those already infected. In 2012, the FDA approved the medication for use as pre-exposure prophylaxis (PrEP), based on growing evidence that the medication was safe and effective at preventing HIV in populations at increased risk of infection. The FDA has approved two additional medications for PrEP since then, approving Descovy in 2019 and cabotegravir (Apretude) in 2021.

In 2012, the World Health Organization (WHO) issued guidelines for PrEP and made similar recommendations for its use among men and transgender women who have sex with men. The WHO noted that "international scientific consensus is emerging that antiretroviral drugs, including PrEP, significantly reduce the risk of sexual acquisition and transmission of HIV regardless of population or setting." In 2014, on the basis of further evidence, the WHO updated the recommendation for men who have sex with men to state that PrEP "is recommended as an additional HIV prevention choice within a comprehensive HIV prevention package." In November 2015, the WHO expanded this further, on the basis of further evidence, and stated that it had "broadened the recommendation to include all population groups at substantial risk of HIV infection" and emphasized that PrEP should be "an additional prevention choice in a comprehensive package of services."

As of 2018, numerous countries have approved the use of PrEP for HIV/AIDS prevention, including the United States, South Korea, France, Norway, Australia, Israel, Canada, Kenya, South Africa, Peru, Thailand, the European Union, United Kingdom, and Taiwan.

New Zealand was one of the first countries in the world to publicly fund PrEP for the prevention of HIV in March 2018. Funded access to PrEP will require that people undergo regular testing for HIV and other sexually transmitted infections, and are monitored for risk of side effects. People taking funded PrEP will receive advice on ways to reduce the risk of HIV and sexually transmitted infections.

In Australia, the country's Therapeutic Goods Administration approved the use of Truvada as PrEP in May 2016, allowing Australian providers to legally prescribe the medication. On 21 March 2018, the Federal Minister for Health announced that PrEP will be subsidized by the Australian Government through the Pharmaceutical Benefits Scheme (PBS) from 1 April 2018. The Laurus Labs branded version is also available on PBS from October 2024.

=== Lenacapavir ===
Lenacapavir could be available in the world's poorest countries by 2025 or 2026, pending regulatory approvals from bodies like the US Food and Drug Administration (FDA) and the World Health Organization (WHO). The Global Fund to Fight AIDS, Tuberculosis and Malaria, stated that the goal is to begin distributing Gilead Sciences' lenacapavir within that timeframe. Already approved as a treatment for multi-drug resistant HIV—costing approximately $42,250 for the first year in the US—lenacapavir has also shown strong efficacy in preventing HIV infection during recent clinical trials. Gilead is actively seeking regulatory approvals for its preventive use worldwide. To expedite access for low- and middle-income countries, the Global Fund will collaborate with the US President's Emergency Plan for AIDS Relief (PEPFAR), with financial backing from the Children's Investment Fund Foundation and the Bill and Melinda Gates Foundation, aiming to make the expensive drug affordable in these regions from the outset.

Lenacapavir, as Yeztugo, is indicated for pre‑exposure prophylaxis to reduce the risk of sexually acquired HIV-1 in adults and adolescents weighing more than 35 kilograms (77 lb) who are at risk for HIV-1 acquisition. The European Commission has approved Gilead's twice-yearly injectable lenacapavir—under the name Yeytuo—for HIV prevention across the European Union, as well as in Norway, Iceland, and Liechtenstein. Gilead must now negotiate pricing and reimbursement terms with each country's health system, following a similar June approval in the U.S. where the drug is sold as Yeztugo and carries a list price exceeding $28,000 annually—an obstacle cited by some insurers. Additionally, Gilead has submitted regulatory applications in several other countries—including Australia, Brazil, Canada, South Africa, and Switzerland—and plans further filings in Latin America, while also expanding access in low- and middle-income nations through strategic agreements.

=== Availability and pricing in the United States ===
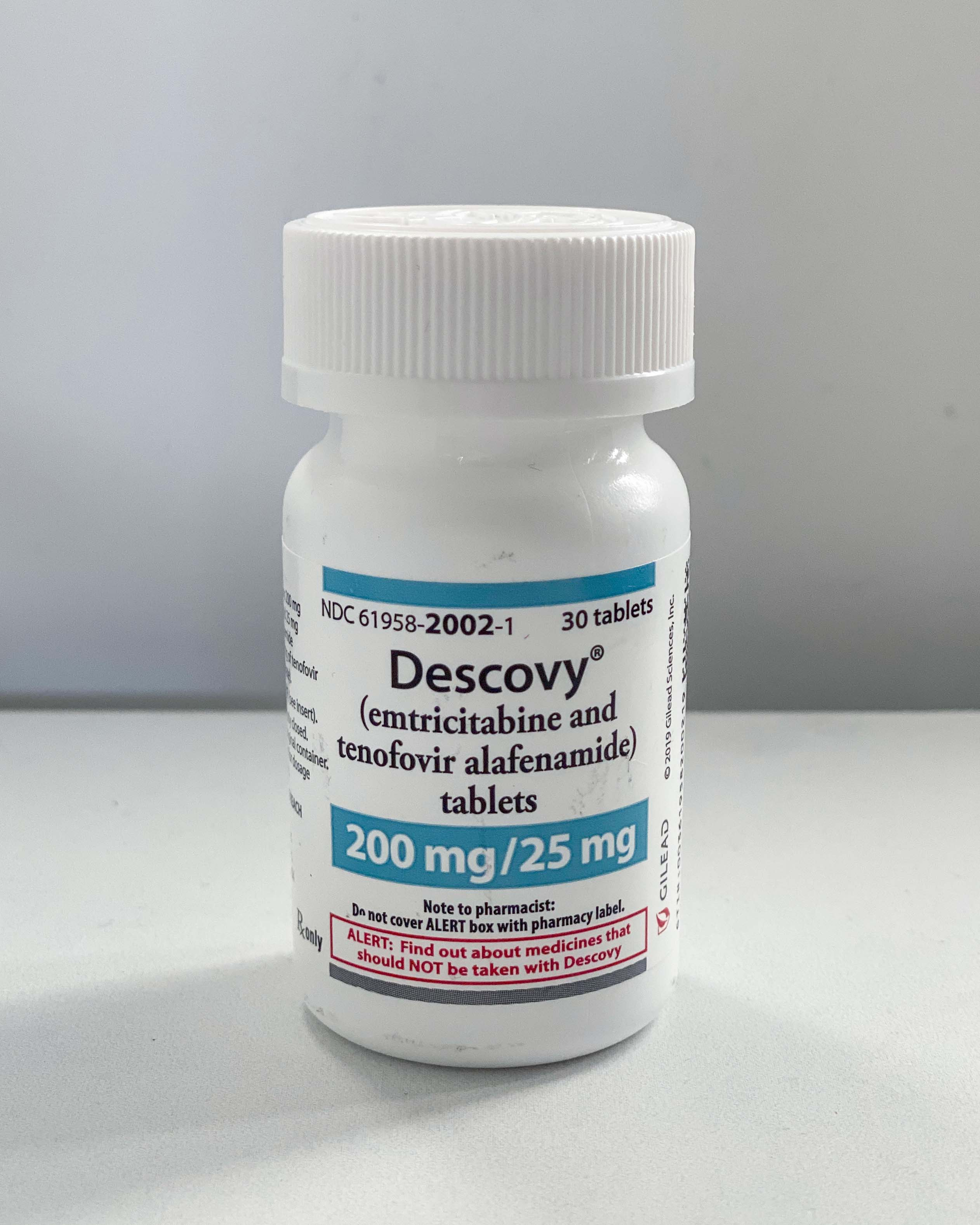
A bottle of 200 mg/25 mg emtricitabine and tenofovir alafenamide, used for PrEP under the brand Descovy, developed by Gilead Sciences

Within the United States, Truvada and Descovy are brand name products of Gilead Sciences that cost around US$2,200/month (a 30-day supply) at wholesale price. In other countries around the world, generic Truvada is available for a much lower price. Expected fall of 2020, Teva Pharmaceuticals will begin producing a generic version of Truvada within the United States; however, it has been reported that the details surrounding the rights to the patent are unclear, which makes it difficult to predict if this will increase access to the medications. In the meantime, there are several assistance programs at the local, state, and national level for gaining access to PrEP at reduced costs. Gilead has an "advancing access" co-pay coupon program that can be accessed by individuals and providers alike to help cover some of the monthly costs of these medications.

In December 2019, the US announced the Ready, Set, PrEP program to provide free PrEP to the uninsured through major drugstore chains. The Ready, Set, PrEP program is led by the US Department of Health and Human Services (HHS) and allows qualifying individuals to fill their prescription for PrEP medication free of cost at their choice of participating pharmacies or through the mail.

NPIN PrEP Provider Data and Locator Widget was launched on the CDC website to provide a comprehensive, national directory of public and private providers in the US that offer pre-exposure prophylaxis (PrEP) to prevent HIV infection. The database includes over 1,800 PrEP providers from all 50 US states as well as US territories.

Beginning in January 2020, after California Governor Gavin Newsom signed Senate Bill 159 (SB159) in 2019, licensed pharmacists in California are authorized to initiate and dispense a 30 to 60 day supply of pre-exposure prophylaxis (PrEP) or the full course of post-exposure prophylaxis (PEP) without a doctor's prescription, given certain clinical criteria of the individual are met. The bill acts as an extension of Medi-Cal benefits (the Medicaid program in the state of California). The law is recognized by pharmacist organizations, health providers, legislators, and the general public to be the removal of a barrier to direct and time-dependent access to these medications, especially for those in communities most affected by HIV/AIDS.

=== Politics and culture ===
Since the FDA approval of PrEP for the prevention of HIV, moves toward greater adoption of PrEP have met some issues, especially around the overall public health effect of widespread adoption, the cost of PrEP and associated disparities in availability and access. Many public health organizations and governments have embraced PrEP as a part of their overall strategy for reducing HIV. For example, in 2014 New York state governor Andrew Cuomo initiated a three-part plan to reduce HIV across New York that specifically emphasized access to PrEP. Similarly, the city of San Francisco launched a "Getting to Zero" campaign. The campaign aims to dramatically reduce the number of new HIV infections in the city and relies on expanding access to PrEP as a key strategy for achieving that goal. Public health officials report that since 2013 the number of new HIV infections in San Francisco has decreased almost 50% and that such improvements are likely related to the city's campaign to reduce new infections. Additionally, numerous public health campaigns have been launched to educate the public about PrEP. For instance, in New York City in 2016 Gay Men's Health Crisis launched an ad campaign in bus shelters across the city reminding riders that adherence to PrEP is important to ensuring the regimen is maximally effective. In Washington, D.C., a PrEP campaign was launched to increase the number of D.C. residents taking PrEP. Social media pushes, such as an ad campaign called "PrEP for Her", targeted African-American women, who, along with gay and bisexual African-American men, are at high risk of infection in the district. Other states and cities that have initiated "Getting to Zero" campaigns include Massachusetts, Connecticut, Illinois, San Diego, Silicon Valley/Santa Clara, and Miami-Dade. In the UK, the campaign Prepster has targeted young people of color.

Despite those efforts, PrEP remains controversial among some who worry that widespread PrEP adoption could cause public health issues by enabling risky sexual behaviors. AIDS Healthcare Foundation founder Michael Weinstein has been vocal in his opposition to PrEP adoption, suggesting that PrEP causes people to make riskier decisions about sex than they would otherwise make, although the organization is the largest provider of PrEP in the U.S. New research, however, indicates that there is no change in STI rates following PrEP implementation. Other critics point out that despite implementation of PrEP, significant disparities exist. For example, some point out that African Americans bear a disproportionate burden of HIV infections but may be less likely than whites to access PrEP. Still other critics of PrEP object to the high cost of the regimen. For example, the U.K.'s NHS initially refused to offer PrEP to individuals citing concerns about cost and suggested that local officials ought to bear the responsibility of paying for the drug. However, following significant advocacy efforts, the NHS started to offer PrEP to people in the UK in 2017.

=== Impact on the culture of men who have sex with men ===
PrEP is used predominantly by men who have sex with men, often as an alternative to condoms to allow otherwise unprotected "bareback" sex. For the first time since the outbreak of the AIDS crisis, PrEP makes somewhat HIV-protected sex without condoms possible, and since its availability, sex without condoms has increased. PrEP does not prevent the transmission of sexually transmitted infections other than HIV and is not 100% effective.

=== Barriers to use ===
Recent systematic reviews have investigated barriers to PrEP. On a structural level, findings indicate cost of PrEP, having multiple healthcare providers, and the frequency of follow-ups play a role. Other barriers include stigma and stereotyping from family, friends and providers. A systematic review found that awareness of PrEP is low, but individuals were receptive to use when presented with information. Common barriers to PrEP use include lack of communication between an individual and their doctor, stigmatization, concerns about safety, side effects, and cost and effectiveness. A possible explanation for low PrEP recommendations from physicians is the "Purview Paradox." This refers to HIV specialists believing primary care providers should be responsible for recommending and prescribing PrEP to patients. However, primary care providers believe this is out of their scope of practice and PrEP use should be managed by HIV specialists.

Within the MSM community, the greatest barrier to PrEP use has been the stigma surrounding HIV and gay men. Gay men on PrEP have experienced "slut-shaming". Numerous other barriers were identified, including lack of quality LGBTQ care, cost, and adherence to medication use.

Transgender women are disproportionally affected by HIV/AIDS, and PrEP is often underused. Similar to the MSM community, stigma surrounding HIV poses a barrier for PrEP use, along with low awareness, requiring social support and tailored communication for transgender people regarding PrEP usage. Additional barriers transgender women face include concerns about side effects, hormone therapy, adherence, and interaction with healthcare workers.

Challenges encountered by people engaging in injection drug use include limited access to healthcare providers, expense of medication, and follow-up for HIV testing.

Cisgender women believe they are at low risk for HIV transmission even though they meet eligibility requirements for PrEP. Low marketing for women, potential stigma from support system and lack of knowledge about PrEP posed as a barrier.

== Research studies ==
Initial studies of PrEP strategies in non-human primates showed a reduced risk of infection among animals that receive ARVs prior to exposure to a simian form of HIV. A 2007 study at UT-Southwestern (Dallas) and the University of Minnesota showed PrEP to be effective in "humanized" laboratory mice. In 2008, the iPrEx study demonstrated 42% reduction of HIV infection among men who have sex with men, and subsequent analysis of the data has suggested that 99% protection is achievable if the drugs are taken every day.

PrEP approaches with agents besides Truvada are being investigated. In December 2021, the FDA approved cabotegravir (Apretude), which was the first injectable drug for PrEP that is taken every two months. There has been some evidence that other regimens, like ones based on the antiretroviral agent Maraviroc, could potentially prevent HIV infection. Similarly, researchers are investigating whether drugs could be used in ways other than a daily pill to prevent HIV, including PrEP-releasing implants or rectally administered PrEP.

Data on efficacy and safety of PrEP in adolescents are insufficient. Risks and benefits of PrEP use should be considered for adolescents.

Below is a table summarizing some of the major research studies that demonstrated PrEP with Truvada to be effective across different populations:

Study	Type	Type of PrEP	Study Population	Efficacy	Percent of patients who took medication (adherence)
CAPRISA 004	Double-blind, randomized	Pericoital tenofovir gel	South African females	39% reduction of HIV infection	72% by applicator count
iPrEx		Oral emtricitabine/tenofovir	Men who have sex with men and transgender women	42% reduction of HIV infection. 99% reduction estimated with daily adherence	54% detectable in blood
Partners PrEP		Oral emtricitabine/tenofovir; oral tenofovir	African heterosexual couples	Reduction of infection by 73% with Truvada and 62% with tenofovir	80% with Truvada and 83% with tenofovir detectable in blood
TDF2		Oral emtricitabine/tenofovir	Botswana heterosexual couples	63% reduction of infection	84% by pill count
FEM-PrEP		Oral emtricitabine/tenofovir	African heterosexual females	No reduction (study halted due to low adherence)	<30% with detectable levels in blood
VOICE 003		Oral emtricitabine/tenofovir; oral tenofovir; vaginal tenofovir gel	African heterosexual females	No reduction in oral tenofovir or vaginal gel arms [oral emtricitabine/tenofovir arm ongoing]	<30% with detectable levels in blood
Bangkok Tenofovir Study	Randomized, double-blind	Oral tenofovir	Thai male injection drug users	48.9% reduction of infection	84% by directly observed therapy and study diaries
IPERGAY	Randomized, double-blind	Oral emtricitabine/tenofovir	French and Quebecois gay males	86% reduction of infection (video summary)	86% with detectable levels in blood
PROUD	Randomized, open-label	Oral tenofovir-emtricitabine	High-risk men who have sex with men in England	86% reduction of HIV incidence	
HPTN 083	Randomized, double-blind	Cabotegravir versus emtricitabine/tenofovir	Transgender women and cisgender men who have sex with men in Argentina, Brazil, Peru, Thailand, the United States, Vietnam, and South Africa.	Highly efficacious compared to daily oral TDF/FTC.	
Discover study	Randomized, double-blind	oral TDF/FTC versus TAF/FTC	High-risk men who have sex with men in Europe, North and South America	TAF/FTC was non-inferior with more favorable bone and kidney outcomes	

=== Possibility of increased risk-taking ===
While PrEP appears to be extremely successful in reducing HIV infection, there is mixed evidence that there might be a change in use of condoms in anal sex, raising risks of spreading sexually transmitted infections other than HIV. In a meta-analysis, researchers found no significant increase in risk for STIs following starting PrEP. The same systematic review found there to be no change in amount of sexual partners or condom use while using PrEP. In addition, PrEP can be an opportunity for MSM to access sexual health care, testing, treatment and counseling services.

=== Emerging treatments ===
Although HIV PrEP medications are only available in oral tablet and injectable formulations, other formulations are being developed and studied. The emerging treatments expand HIV prevention strategies for women. For example, a vaginal gel formulation of tenofovir and an intravaginal ring releasing dapivirine are under investigation for efficacy. Out of three completed trials evaluating safety and efficacy of tenofovir vaginal gel, only the CAPRISA 004 trial showed the drug to be efficacious in decreasing the risk of HIV infection. However, the demonstrated effectiveness of tenofovir vaginal gel was deemed not significant enough to move forward with the product. In contrast, the ASPIRE study and The Ring Study evaluating the dapivirine-releasing intravaginal ring have demonstrated efficacy in reducing incidence of HIV infection. In addition to these two treatments, an injectable form of cabotegravir is being evaluated for efficacy in the HPTN 03 and HPTN 04 trials.

At the 2024 International AIDS Conference, PrEP with long-acting injectable cabotegravir (CAB-LA; Apretude) appears safe during pregnancy among cisgender women, according to an analysis from the HPTN 084 open-label extension trial. Researchers observed composite poor pregnancy outcomes in 33% of pregnancies with active CAB-LA use, 38% with prior CAB-LA use, and 27% with no CAB-LA use.
