= Coovadia =

Coovadia is a surname. Notable people with the surname include:

- Hoosen Coovadia (born 1940), South African doctor
- Imraan Coovadia (born 1970), South African novelist, essayist, and academic
