= Anna Coutsoudis =

South African public health scientist

- Born: September 21, 1952 (age 73)
- Education: University of Natal
- Awards: Science for Society Gold Medal
- Scientific career
- Fields: Public health
- Workplaces: University of KwaZulu-Natal
- Thesis: Epidemiological and clinical studies of vitamin A in Black South African pre-school children (1993)
- Website: https://paediatrics.ukzn.ac.za/profannacoutsoudis/

Anna Coutsoudis (born 21 September 1952) is a South African public health scientist and academic who has conducted research on HIV and nutrition, specializing in the benefits of breastfeeding. An elected member of the Academy of Science of South Africa, she is a founder member and chair of iThemba Lethu, an organization for children with HIV, which provides a community-based breast milk bank.

== Biography ==
Coutsoudis received her BSc from the University of Natal in 1974, followed by a Higher Diploma in Education in 1975. Later, while raising a family, she completed her studies at the same university, earning a PhD from the Department of Paediatrics and Child Health with a thesis titled Epidemiological and clinical studies of vitamin A in Black South African pre-school children.

She was honoured by an award from La Leche League International in 2001 for stressing the benefits of breastfeeding while in 2004 her extensive work on nutrition research was recognized by the Nutrition Society of South Africa.

In Mexico at the International AIDS Society Conference in 2008, Coutsoudis presented a convincing and well-received paper which stressed the benefits of breastfeeding for HIV-affected infants. The following year, an article she and her colleague Hoosen Coovadia published in The Lancet called on the South African government to stop providing free formula milk to HIV-infected mothers, causing outrage from HIV activists. In particular, Cousoudis criticized the commercial promotion of formula milk for young babies in South Africa, especially as it countered recommendations from the World Health Organization. In September 2016, Coutsoudis participated in the International Atomic Energy Agency's 60th conference in Vienna where she was a key speaker at a well-attended event on "Nuclear Techniques to Assess Breastfeeding Practices".

Coutsoudis has served on various committees of the World Health Organization including the Steering Committee of the Child and Adolescent Health Unit and guideline development groups on Vitamin A Supplementation and HIV and Infant Feeding. She has published over 100 peer-reviewed scientific articles.

== Awards and honors ==
In 2009, Anna Coutsoudis was awarded the Science for Society Gold Medal by the Academy of Science of South Africa.
