= Global health initiative =

Fundraising initiatives for health in developing countries

Global health initiatives (GHIs) are humanitarian initiatives that raise and disburse additional funds for infectious diseases – such as AIDS, tuberculosis, and malaria – for immunizations and for strengthening health systems in developing countries. GHIs classify a type of global initiative, which is defined as an organized effort integrating the involvement of organizations, individuals, and stakeholders around the world to address a global issue (i.e.: climate change, human rights, etc.).

== History ==
The initial global health initiative was launched by Kofi Annan at the annual meeting of the World Economic Forum in 2002. Annan stated that the GHI's mission was to engage businesses in public–private partnerships to tackle HIV/AIDS, tuberculosis, malaria, and health systems.

Examples of GHIs are the President's Emergency Plan for AIDS Relief (PEPFAR), the Global Fund to Fight AIDS, Tuberculosis and Malaria (Global Fund), and the World Bank's Multi-country AIDS Programme (MAP).

PEPFAR – an initiative established in 2003 by the Bush Administration – and PEPFAR II (PEPFAR's successor in 2009 under the Obama Administration) are bilateral agreements between the United States and a recipient of its development aid for HIV/AIDS – typically an international non-government organisation INGO or a recipient country's government. The Global Fund, established in 2002, and the GAVI Alliance, launched in 2000, are public-private partnerships that raise and disburse funds to treat AIDS, Tuberculosis and Malaria, and for immunization and vaccines. The World Bank is an International financial institution. It is the largest source of funding for HIV/AIDS within the United Nations System and has a portfolio of HIV/AIDS programmes dating back to 1989. In 2000, the Bank launched the first phase of its response to HIV/AIDS in Sub-Saharan Africa – the Multi-Country AIDS Program (MAP). This came to an end in 2006 when a second phase – Agenda for Action 2007–11 – came into effect.

== Functions ==
In terms of their institutional structure, GHIs have little in common with each other. In terms of their function – specifically their ability to raise and disburse funds, provide resources and coordinate and/or implement disease control in multiple countries – GHIs share some common ground, even if the mechanisms through which each of these functions is performed are different.

== Funding ==
Figure 1: Donor commitments to GHIs

Tracking funding from GHIs poses challenges. However, it is possible to determine the amounts of funding GHIs commit and disburse from sources such as the OECD CRS online database, as well as data provided by individual GHIs (Figure 1).

Since 1989, the World Bank has committed approximately US$4.2bn in loans and credits for programs, and has disbursed US$3.1bn. Of this total, the Bank's MAP has committed US$1.9bn since 2000. Through bilateral contributions to HIV/AIDS and Tuberculosis programmes and donations to the Global Fund, PEPFAR has donated approximately US$25.6bn since 2003. In July 2008, the U.S. Senate re-authorised a further US$48 bn over five years for PEPFAR II, of which US$6.7bn has been requested for FY 2010. During the period 2001–2010, donors have pledged US$21.1bn to the Global Fund, of which US$15.8bn has been paid by donors to the Fund. Gavi has approved US$3.7bn for the period 2000–2015.

== Political economy ==
The amount of political priority given to global health initiatives varies between national and international governing powers. Though evidence shows that there exists an inequity between resource allocation for initiatives concerning issues such as child immunization, HIV/AIDS, and family planning in comparison to initiatives for high-burden disorders such as malnutrition and pneumonia, the source of this variance is unknown due to lack of systematic research pertaining to this subject. Global political priority is defined as the extent to which national and international political leaders address an issue of international concern through support in the forms of human capital, technology, and/or finances in order to aid efforts to resolve the problem. Global political priority is demonstrated through national and international leaders expressing sustained concern both privately and publicly, political systems and organizations enacting policies to help alleviate the issue, and national and international agencies providing resource levels that reflect the severity of the given crisis.

The amount of attention a given global initiative receives is considerably dependent on the power and authority of actors connected to the issue, the power and impact of ideas defining and describing the issue, the power of political contexts framing the environments in which the actors operate to address the issue, as well as the weight and power of issue characteristics indicating the severity of the issue (i.e.: statistical indicators, severity metrics, efficacy of proposed interventions, etc.). Factors including objective measurability, scalability of the issue and proposed interventions, ability to track and monitor progress, risk of perceived harm, as well as simplicity and affordability of proposed solutions all contribute to the degree to which a given global initiative is likely to receive political attention.

However, case studies have shown that the likelihood of global initiatives garnering public and political attention is not limited to the aforementioned factors. For example, initiatives concerning polio eradication continue to receive substantial resources in spite of the relatively small global burden of disease as compared to chronic diseases such as cancer, cardiovascular disorders, diabetes, and some communicable diseases such as pneumonia which comparatively attract fewer worldwide resources irrespective of the high morbidity and mortality rates associated with such diseases. These cases highlight the need for extensive research methods and evaluative measures to assess the relative causal weights of factors used to determine how global political priority is attributed to global health initiatives. Existing debates also attribute factors such as the increasing influences of economic globalization, international organizations, and economic actors with little to no previous health remit as each contributing to the evolution of global health governance.

== Impact on country health systems ==
There is much discussion about the extent to which the volume of these additional funds creates multiple effects that positively and negatively impact both health systems and health outcomes for specific diseases. Assessing the direct impact of GHIs on specific diseases and health systems poses challenges pertaining to the issue of attributing particular effects to individual GHIs. As such, a common response in evaluations of GHIs is to acknowledge the inherent limitations of establishing causal chains in what is a highly complex public health environment, and to base conclusions on adequacy statements resulting from trends that demonstrate substantial growth in process and impact indicators.

However, existing literature argues that this approach towards evaluating GHIs can inadvertently result in overlooking the impact of social determinants on a disease, as implementers and evaluators are less likely to tackle the complexity of a disease within the larger social, political, cultural, and environmental system. Even if a GHI is effectively evaluated – perhaps showing a decrease in disease prevalence – the challenge remains of comprehensively analyzing the long-term impacts of the GHI by addressing the root social, political, or environmental causes of the disease. Accordingly, existing debates suggest that GHIs should be less concerned with the eradication of specific diseases, and should instead focus primarily on factors – such as basic living conditions, sanitation, and access to nutritious food – that are essential to delivering a sustainable heath program.

== Research on the effects ==
A small number of institutions have shaped, and continue to shape, research on GHIs. In 2003, researchers at Abt Associates devised an influential framework for understanding the system-wide effects of the Global fund which has informed much subsequent research, including their own studies of system-wide effects of the Global Fund in Benin, Ethiopia, Georgia and Malawi – often referred to as the 'SWEF' studies.

Abt continues to support ongoing research on the effects of GHIs in multiple countries. The Washington-based Center for Global Development has also been very active in its analysis of GHIs, particularly PEPFAR financing. With hubs in London and Dublin, the Global Health Initiatives Network (GHIN) has been coordinating and supporting research in 22 countries on the effects of GHIs on existing health systems.

Knowledge of the effects of GHIs on specific diseases and on health systems comes from multiple sources. Longitudinal studies enable researchers to establish baseline data and then track and compare GHI effects on disease control or country health systems over time. In addition to Abt Associates' SWEF studies, additional early examples of this type of analysis were three-year, multi-country studies of the Global Fund in Mozambique, Tanzania, Uganda and Zambia. In 2009, research findings were published from tracking studies in Kyrgyzstan, Peru and Ukraine that sought to identify the health effects of the Global Fund at national and sub-national levels.

In contrast to longitudinal studies, multi-country analyses of GHIs can provide a 'snapshot' of GHI effects but are often constrained by "aggressive timelines". The Maximising Positive Synergies Academic Consortium, for example, reported in 2009 on the effects of the Global Fund and PEPFAR on disease control and health systems, drawing on data from 20 countries. Most GHI evaluations – both internally and externally commissioned – rely on this type of short-term analysis and, inevitably, there is often a trade-off between depth and breadth of reporting.

Synthesis of data from multiple sources is an invaluable resource for making sense of the effects of GHIs. Early synthesis studies include a 2004 synthesis of findings on the effects of the Global Fund in four countries by researchers at the London School of Hygiene and Tropical Medicine (LSHTM), a 2005 study by McKinsey & Company and an assessment of the comparative advantages of the Global Fund and World Bank AIDS programs.

Two wide-ranging studies were published in 2009: a study of interactions between GHIs and country health systems commissioned by the World Health Organization and a study by researchers from LSHTM and the Royal College of Surgeons in Ireland. The latter study – "The effects of global health initiatives on country health systems: a review of the evidence from HIV/AIDS control" – reviewed the literature on the effects of the Global fund, the World Bank MAP and PEPFAR on country health systems with respect to: 1) national policy; 2) coordination and planning; 3) stakeholder involvement; 4) disbursement, absorptive capacity and management; 5) monitoring & evaluation; and 6) human resources (Table 2).

== Evaluations ==
In a comparison between the three largest donors in sponsoring efforts to win the fight against AIDS in Africa, a research study found that PEPFAR performs best in money transfer and data collection; the Global Fund outperforms in tailoring programmatic initiatives and sharing data; and MAP performs highest in collaborating with government systems, strengthening health systems, and helping to build the capacity of local recipients. Each of the four GHIs summarized has been evaluated at least once since 2005 and all four produce their own annual reports.

=== World Bank MAP ===
The primary purpose of the MAP initiative was to introduce a major upscaling of multi-sectoral approach to responding to the HIV/AIDS crisis in Sub-Saharan Africa by involving a multitude of stakeholders including community-based organizations (CBOs), non-governmental organizations (NGOs), line ministries, and state governments at the highest levels.

A comprehensive study of MAP programs published in 2007 reviewed whether MAP was implemented as designed, but did not evaluate MAP or assess its impact. In addition, there have been two evaluations that provide important additional insight into the effectiveness of the Bank's HIV/AIDS programmes (though not specifically MAP focused). In 2005, the Bank conducted an internal evaluation – "Committing to Results: Improving the Effectiveness of HIV/AIDS Assistance" – which found that National AIDS strategies were not always prioritised or costed.

Supervision, and monitoring and evaluation (M&E), were weak; civil society had not been engaged; political commitment and capacity had been overestimated, and mechanisms for political mobilisation were weak; and bank research and analysis, whilst perceived to be useful, was not reaching policy makers in Africa. In 2009, a hard-hitting evaluation of the Bank's Health, Nutrition and Population support – "Improving Effectiveness of Outcomes for the Poor in Health, Nutrition and Population" – found that a third of the Bank's HNP lending had not performed well, and that while the performance of the Bank's International Finance Corporation investments had improved, accountability was weak.

=== GAVI Alliance ===
Though GHIs have been instrumental in bringing national and international attention to crucial global health issues, existing debates suggest that they can also negatively impact country health systems. As such, disease-specific GHIs such as GAVI have worked to integrate health system strengthening (HSS) measures into programmatic implementation. However, the existing global debate questions the efficacy of HSS programs aimed at targeting technical solutions with clear measurable outcomes versus those more broadly focused on supporting holistic health systems.

In 2008, an evaluation of GAVI's vaccine and immunization support – "Evaluation of the GAVI Phase 1 performance" – reported increased coverage of HepB3, Hib3 and DTP3 and increased coverage in rural areas but also a lack of cost data disaggregated by vaccine that prevented GAVI from accurately evaluating the cost effectiveness of its programs and vaccines, and an "unrealistic" reliance by GAVI on the market to reduce the cost of vaccines. The same year, a study of the financial sustainability of GAVI vaccine support – "Introducing New Vaccines in the Poorest Countries: What did we learn from the GAVI Experience with" – found that although GAVI funding equated to $5 per infant in developing countries per year for the period 2005–10, resource need was accelerating faster than growth in financing.

Findings from two evaluations of GAVI's support for health systems strengthening (HSS) were published in 2009. An external evaluation by HLSP found insufficient technical support provided to countries applying for GAVI grants, an under-performing Independent Review Committee (IRC), and weaknesses in GAVI's monitoring of grant activities. The study also found that countries were using GAVI grants for 'downstream' short-term HSS fixes rather than 'upstream' and long-term structural reform. A study by John Snow, Inc praised the multi-year, flexible and country-driven characteristics of GAVI HSS grant funding and encouraged GAVI to continue this support. But also found weak M&E of grant activity, low Civil Society involvement in the HSS proposal development process, unclear proposal writing guidelines, and over-reliance by countries on established development partners for assistance in implementing health system reform.

=== PEPFAR ===
A quantitative study by Stanford University in 2009 – "The President's Emergency Plan for AIDS Relief in Africa: An Evaluation of Outcomes" – calculated a 10.5% reduction in the death rate in PEPFAR's 12 focus countries, equating to 1.2 million lives saved at a cost of $2450 per death averted. In 2007, an evaluation of PEPFAR by the Institute of Medicine found that PEPFAR had made significant progress in reaching its targets for prevention, treatment and care but also reported that budget allocations "limit the Country Teams ability to harmonize PEPFARs activities with those of the partner government and other donors", and PEPFARs ABC (Abstinence, Be faithful, and correct and consistent Condom use) priorities "fragment the natural continuum of needs and services, often in ways that do not correspond with global standards".

The PEPFAR program has brought about substantial impact in its recipient countries. The level of urgency and scale of initiatives led through the PEPFAR program were commensurate with that of the HIV/AIDS epidemic at the time of implementation. Existing debates suggest that the next phase of the program consider placing emphasis on the development of knowledge surrounding HIV/AIDS programming.

== Examples ==
=== United States Global Health Initiative ===
The United States Global Health Initiative was created in 2009 by President Obama in an attempt to have a more holistic, comprehensive approach to improving global health as opposed to previous, disease-specific interventions. The Global Health Initiative is a six-year plan, "to develop a comprehensive U.S. government strategy for global health, building on the President's Emergency Plan for AIDS Relief (PEPFAR) to combat HIV as well as U.S. efforts to address tuberculosis (TB) and malaria, and augmenting the focus on other global health priorities, including neglected tropical diseases (NTDs), maternal, newborn and child health (MNCH), family planning and reproductive health (FP/RH), nutrition, and health systems strengthening (HSS)". The GHI programs are being implemented in more than 80 countries around the world and works closely with the United States Agency for International Development, the Centers for Disease Control and Prevention, the United States Deputy Secretary of State.

The aid effectiveness agenda is a useful tool for measuring the impact of these large scale programs such as The Global Fund to Fight AIDS, Tuberculosis and Malaria and the Global Alliance for Vaccines and Immunization (GAVI) which have been successful in achieving rapid and visible results. The Global Fund claims that its efforts have provided antiretroviral treatment for over three million people worldwide. GAVI claims that its vaccination programs have prevented over 5 million deaths since it began in 2000.

== See also ==
- Global health funding by the United States
