= Global health funding by the United States =

The United States is the largest donor of multilateral global health funds. According to the Office of Management and Budget, the U.S. government contributes <1% of the federal budget for foreign aid including global health activities. In 2023, the U.S. contributed 12.9 billion USD towards global health activities across several health verticals including HIV, Tuberculosis, Malaria and COVID-19.

In 2024, total U.S. global health funding through regular appropriations reached approximately $12.3 billion in FY 2024, up from $5.4 billion in FY 2006.

In 2025, President Trump’s administration paused U.S. foreign aid, impacting global health programs like PEPFAR and leading to legal challenges. The administration withdrew from the World Health Organization, citing concerns over its effectiveness and political influence. Budget cuts reduced funding for the National Institutes of Health and global health initiatives, raising concerns about research setbacks. USAID was effectively eliminated, with most of its projects ended and the remainder transferred to the State Department. These changes sparked debates over the future of U.S. leadership in global health and the potential humanitarian consequences.

== HIV ==
The allocations by the United States of over $110 billion, represents the largest investment ever made by any nation in a single disease.

The U.S. began funding global HIV initiatives in 1986, with efforts increasing substantially in 2003 with the launch of the President’s Emergency Plan for AIDS Relief (PEPFAR) by U.S. President George W. Bush, the largest program dedicated to a single disease globally. PEPFAR accounts for the majority (89%) of U.S. global HIV funding, which includes support for UNAIDS and international HIV research. Managed by the Department of State's Bureau for Global Health Security and Diplomacy, PEPFAR funding is detailed in annual congressional appropriations and also supports agencies like USAID, CDC, and DoD. The National Institutes of Health (NIH) also contributes to international HIV research. From FY 2015 to FY 2024, global HIV funding represented 42%-50% of the U.S. global health budget, with FY 2024 allocations totaling $5.4 billion, including $4.9 billion for PEPFAR and $575 million for NIH research.

The Biden administration recently announced a six percent cut to the PEPFAR budget for FY 2025 with a proposed budget $4.4 billion.

The Trump administration on January 28, 2025 announced a freeze in funding to PEPFAR. Later in the day on January 28, the Trump administration issued a waiver for critical medicines and medical services, reinstating a global HIV treatment program that had been halted the previous week. U.S. secretary of state Marco Rubio announced the waiver, which seemingly authorized the distribution of HIV medications. However, it was uncertain whether the exemption extended to preventive treatments or other services offered through PEPFAR.

== Malaria ==
The U.S. has participated in global malaria efforts since the 1950s and is currently the second largest donor, following the Global Fund to Fight AIDS, Tuberculosis and Malaria. The President’s Malaria Initiative (PMI), led by USAID and co-implemented with the CDC, drives U.S. malaria activities. Additional support comes from NIH and DoD. U.S. bilateral funding for malaria rose from $854 million in FY 2015 to about $1 billion in FY 2024, representing 9% of the U.S. global health budget. Despite increases over the past decade, funding has stabilized in recent years.

== Tuberculosis ==
The U.S. Agency for International Development (USAID) initiated a global tuberculosis (TB) control program in 1998, the U.S. has become one of the leading donors to global TB control. U.S. bilateral TB funding, managed by USAID, includes contributions to the TB Drug Facility and the Global Fund to Fight AIDS, Tuberculosis and Malaria. Over the past decade, U.S. funding for TB has significantly increased, rising from $242 million in FY 2015 to $406 million in FY 2024, now comprising about 3% of the U.S. global health budget of 12.9 billion USD.

In 2024, funding for tuberculosis research and development hit a record high of $1.2 billion last year, a 20% increase from 2022 and the highest amount recorded since tracking began in 2005. However, this funding is only a fraction—just 25%—of the $5 billion annual goal set during a United Nations High-Level Meeting on TB aimed at ending the epidemic by 2030. Notably, over half of the funding (53%) came from the U.S. National Institutes of Health and the Bill & Melinda Gates Foundation. The 20 largest contributors accounted for 86% of the total. Public sector sources provided 62% of the funding, with philanthropies adding 24%, while the private sector, including pharmaceutical companies, contributed just 9% including contributions from the United States.

== The Global Fund ==
The Global Fund to Fight AIDS, Tuberculosis and Malaria is an independent, multilateral institution that funds HIV, TB, and malaria programs in low- and middle-income countries using contributions from public and private donors. The U.S., its largest donor since providing the founding contribution in 2001, includes these contributions as part of PEPFAR. However, U.S. contributions are subject to restrictions, including a funding match requirement. While U.S. contributions peaked at $2.0 billion in FY 2023, they decreased to $1.7 billion in FY 2024 due to these restrictions. Additionally, the U.S. Congress allocated $3.5 billion in emergency funds in FY 2021 to mitigate COVID-19 impacts on HIV programs.

Global Fund investments have led to a 61% reduction in deaths from HIV, tuberculosis, and malaria since 2002, saving 65 million lives according to a 2024 analysis. The Global Fund’s latest report highlights a 55% price reduction for bedaquiline, a key drug for treating drug-resistant tuberculosis, and a 25% drop in the cost of tenofovir disoproxil fumarate, lamivudine, and dolutegravir (TLD), the first-line treatment for HIV. A new mosquito net, treated with a dual-active ingredient insecticide, is now 45% more effective against malaria. By leveraging its purchasing power, the Global Fund has been able to lower drug prices. It currently supports 25 million people on antiretroviral treatment, preventing 1.66 billion hospitalization days and 1.36 billion outpatient visits, saving about $85 billion.

== World Health Organization ==
On January 20, 2025, immediately after being sworn in for his second term, U.S. President Donald Trump issued an executive order to begin the process of withdrawing the United States from the World Health Organization (WHO). This move carries significant consequences for global health, given that the U.S. has traditionally been the WHO’s largest financial supporter, contributing more than $10 billion in the previous fiscal year and accounting for roughly 18% of its total budget.

== Maternal and Child Health ==
The U.S. has been involved in Maternal & Child Health (MCH) efforts since the 1960s and is the largest donor to global MCH activities. Funding, which includes support for polio eradication and contributions to Gavi, the Vaccine Alliance (GAVI), and UNICEF, is managed by USAID, CDC, and the State Department. From FY 2015 to FY 2024, MCH funding increased from $1.18 billion to $1.29 billion, driven mainly by increased allocations to GAVI and polio, while bilateral MCH funding remained steady. In FY 2024, MCH funding comprised 10% of the U.S. global health budget, making it the third largest category.

Ezekiel Emanuel, a senior advisor to President Obama in the early 2010s, recommended funding MCH initiatives at the expense of future funding increases for PEPFAR. Dr. Emanuel claimed that PEPFAR "is not the best use of international health funding," and "fails to address many of the developing world's most serious health issues." Anand Reddi and Sarah Leeper rebutted Emanuel by stating "The idea that differing global health initiatives must compete with each other lacks not only ethical legitimacy but also scientific merit. Maternal and child health, need not to be framed in opposition to PEPFAR. Confronting illness in isolation -- whether by funding PEPFAR at the expense of programs that target maternal or child health or vice versa -- cannot be our way forward. We should be advocating for funding both PEPFAR and maternal and child health together instead of favoring one program over another."

In 2024, the U.S. government announced a new $20 million PEPFAR Youth Initiative to combat HIV/AIDS among young people; the initiative aims to improve HIV prevention, testing, and treatment services, focusing on youth in high-burden countries and addressing gaps in care and support for young people living with HIV.

== GAVI ==
In 2025, the Trump administration plans to end U.S. funding for GAVI, the organization that has played a key role in providing essential vaccines for children in developing nations.

== mPox 2024 ==
The United States has provided an additional $17 million USD to support clade I mpox preparedness and response in Central and Eastern Africa. This funding is focused on enhanced surveillance, risk communication, community engagement, laboratory supplies, diagnostics, clinical services, and vaccine planning.

== Health Systems Strengthening ==
In 2024, U.S. Global Health Funding includes $10 million for the Global Health Worker Initiative, the first time Congress has provided funding for this initiative that increase education and training of healthcare workers in resource limited settings.
