= Cabotegravir/rilpivirine =

Co-packaged antiretroviral medication

Combination of
- Cabotegravir: Integrase strand transfer inhibitor (INSTI)
- Rilpivirine: Non-nucleoside reverse transcriptase inhibitor (NNRTI)

Clinical data
- Trade names: Cabenuva, Vocabria, Rekambys
- AHFS/Drugs.com: Multum Consumer Information
- MedlinePlus: a621009
- License data: US DailyMed: Cabotegravir_and_rilpivirine; US FDA: Cabenuva
- Pregnancy category: AU: B1
- Routes of administration: Intramuscular
- ATC code: None

Legal status
- Legal status: AU: S4 (Prescription only); CA: ℞-only; US: ℞-only

Identifiers
- KEGG: D11966

Cabotegravir/rilpivirine (CAB/RPV), sold under the brand name Cabenuva, is a co-packaged antiretroviral medication for the treatment of HIV/AIDS. It contains cabotegravir and rilpivirine in a package with two separate injection vials.

The most common adverse reactions include injection site reactions, fever or feeling hot (pyrexia), fatigue, headache, musculoskeletal pain, nausea, sleep disorders, dizziness and rash.

The co-packaged medication was approved for medical use in the United States in January 2021. It is the first FDA-approved injectable, complete regimen for HIV-infected adults that is administered once a month. It is also approved for use in Canada. In the European Union, the two medications are approved separately and have different brand names: Vocabria (for cabotegravir) and Rekambys (for rilpivirine).

== Medical uses ==
Cabotegravir/rilpivirine is indicated as a complete regimen for the treatment of human immunodeficiency virus type 1 (HIV-1) infection in adults to replace a current antiretroviral regimen in those who are virologically suppressed on a stable antiretroviral regimen with no history of treatment failure. In the European Union, the combination is indicated for maintenance treatment of adults who have undetectable HIV levels in the blood (viral load less than 50 copies/mL) with their current antiretroviral treatment, and when the virus has not developed resistance to non-nucleoside reverse transcriptase inhibitors (NNRTIs) and integrase strand transfer inhibitors.

== Contraindications and interactions ==
Cabotegravir/rilpivirine must not be combined with drugs that induce the liver enzyme CYP3A4, because they accelerate the inactivation of rilpivirine, and/or the enzyme UGT1A1, because they accelerate the inactivation of cabotegravir. These mechanisms potentially result in loss of effectiveness. Examples for such drugs are rifampicin, rifapentine, carbamazepine, oxcarbazepine, eslicarbazepine acetate, phenytoin, primidone, phenobarbital and some glucocorticoids.

== Adverse effects ==
The most common side effects include reactions at the injection site (in up to 84% of patients) such as pain and swelling, as well as headache (up to 12%) and fever or feeling hot (in 10%). Less common side effects (under 10%) are depressive disorders, insomnia, rashes, fatigue, musculoskeletal pain, nausea, sleep disorders, and dizziness.

== Pharmacology ==
Cabotegravir is an integrase strand transfer inhibitor. Rilpivirine is a non-nucleoside reverse transcriptase inhibitor (NNRTI).

== History ==
The safety and efficacy of cabotegravir/rilpivirine were established through two randomized, open-label, controlled clinical trials (Trial 1/NCT02938520 and Trial 2/NCT02951052) in 1,182 HIV-infected adults who were virologically suppressed (HIV-1 RNA less than 50 copies/milliliter) before initiation of treatment with cabotegravir/rilpivirine. Participants in both trials continued to show virologic suppression at the conclusion of each study, and no clinically relevant change from baseline in CD4+ cell counts was observed. Trials were conducted at 223 sites in 24 countries including the United States.

In Trial 1, participants who were never treated for the infection before, received an approved therapy for 20 weeks. Those who did well after this treatment (who had HIV-1 RNA less than 50 copies/milliliter) were then randomized to receive either cabotegravir/rilpivirine (for the first four weeks they received tablets) or to remain on the same therapy for additional 44 weeks. Participants and the health providers knew which treatments have been given.

In Trial 2, participants who were previously successfully treated for the infection (who had HIV-1 RNA less than 50 copies/milliliter), were randomized to receive either cabotegravir/rilpivirine (for the first four weeks they received tablets) or to remain on the same therapy for additional 44 weeks. Participants and the health providers knew which treatments have been given.

In October 2020, the Committee for Medicinal Products for Human Use (CHMP) of the European Medicines Agency (EMA) recommended the granting of a marketing authorization for rilpivirine and cabotegravir, to be used together for the treatment of people with human immunodeficiency virus type 1 (HIV-1) infection. The two medicines are the first antiretrovirals that come in a long-acting injectable formulation. This means that instead of daily pills, people receive intramuscular injections monthly or every two months. Rilpivirine and cabotegravir were approved for medical use in the European Union in December 2020, as two separate medications.

In January 2021, the U.S. Food and Drug Administration (FDA) granted the approval of Cabenuva to ViiV Healthcare.

The combination was approved for medical use in Australia in February 2021.

Cabotegravir/rilpivirine is not yet available in lower and middle income countries and it is unclear if this will be feasible in the next few years. The first study testing its use in African countries reported positive results in 2024.
