= Orphans and vulnerable children =

Most at-risk young people in humanitarian situations

Orphans and vulnerable children is a term used to identify the most at-risk group among young people in contexts such as humanitarian aid and education in developing countries. It often used relating to countries in sub-Saharan Africa with a high number of AIDS orphans.

There has been much discussion about the meaning of the term "orphans and vulnerable children". One source says a child who is vulnerable could have one or both parents but does not have basic needs or rights fulfilled. An orphan is considered to be a child whose parents have died. A child could be considered an orphan if one parent has died especially if that parent was the provider for the family.

The label of "orphans and vulnerable children" probably originated in the early 1990s, evolving from the phrase "children affected by AIDS and other vulnerable children", as the United Nations Children's fund (UNICEF) brought attention to children who were being greatly affected by the AIDS epidemic. The term was used in the beginning to talk about children who had lost caregivers to HIV/AIDS and other such vulnerable children. The term "orphans and vulnerable children" channeled aid to those children who were greatly in need of assistance.

Children around the world who are living in dangerous or unhealthy conditions are being helped by the U.S. President's Emergency Plan for AIDS Relief known as PEPFAR. Through this program, USAID implements programs to assist orphans and vulnerable children. This includes children who are HIV positive, who have parents or guardians who are HIV positive, and/or who are orphans.

Globally in 2020, children below the age of seventeen who have had one or both of their parents die of AIDS numbered about 15.5 million. Only about half of the more than 1.5 million children worldwide who are HIV positive are receiving treatment. In sub-Saharan Africa even fewer children are being treated. In these countries it is much more probable that young females will contract HIV than will young males.

In 2021 over 7 million orphans and vulnerable children and their care providers were helped through the PEPFAR program,
