= Health systems strengthening =

Term used in global public health

Health systems strengthening (also health system strengthening, abbreviated HSS) is a term used in global health that roughly means to improve the health care system of a country. Within this general definition, it can mean increasing funding for health infrastructure, improving health policy, trying to achieve universal healthcare, or any number of other health measures.

There has been some effort to use a systems thinking approach to health systems strengthening.

== Usage ==
Various health organizations have claimed to use health systems strengthening (while not necessarily agreeing on the definition). Some of these are:

- World Health Organization (WHO)
- US Agency for International Development (USAID, uses different definition from the one in a 2006 Global Fund-commissioned WHO report); USAID states that HSS has been "at the core of [its] mission in health for the last 20 years", and defines HSS as "initiating activities in the six internationally accepted core HSS functions – human resources for health; health finance; health governance; health information; medical products, vaccines, and technologies; and service delivery".
- GAVI Alliance
- The Global Fund
- PEPFAR (though less developed)
- Roll Back Malaria (uses different definition from the one in a 2006 Global Fund-commissioned WHO report)
- Stop TB Partnership (uses different definition from the one in a 2006 Global Fund-commissioned WHO report)

== Reception ==
Both the idea of health systems strengthening and the term itself have received attention. Even advocates of health systems strengthening admit that it can often seem like a "distant, even abstract aim".

Marchal et al., writing in 2009, called the term "vague" and argued that "most current HSS strategies are selective (i.e., they target a specific disease), and their effects may undermine progress towards the long-term goal of effective, high-quality, and inclusive health systems."

Peter Berman, who was the lead health economist at the World Bank, has pointed out that "Almost any support to health interventions can be considered HSS".

== See also ==
- Community health agent
- Health policy and systems research
- Timeline of global health
