= Cabotegravir =

Medication for HIV/AIDS

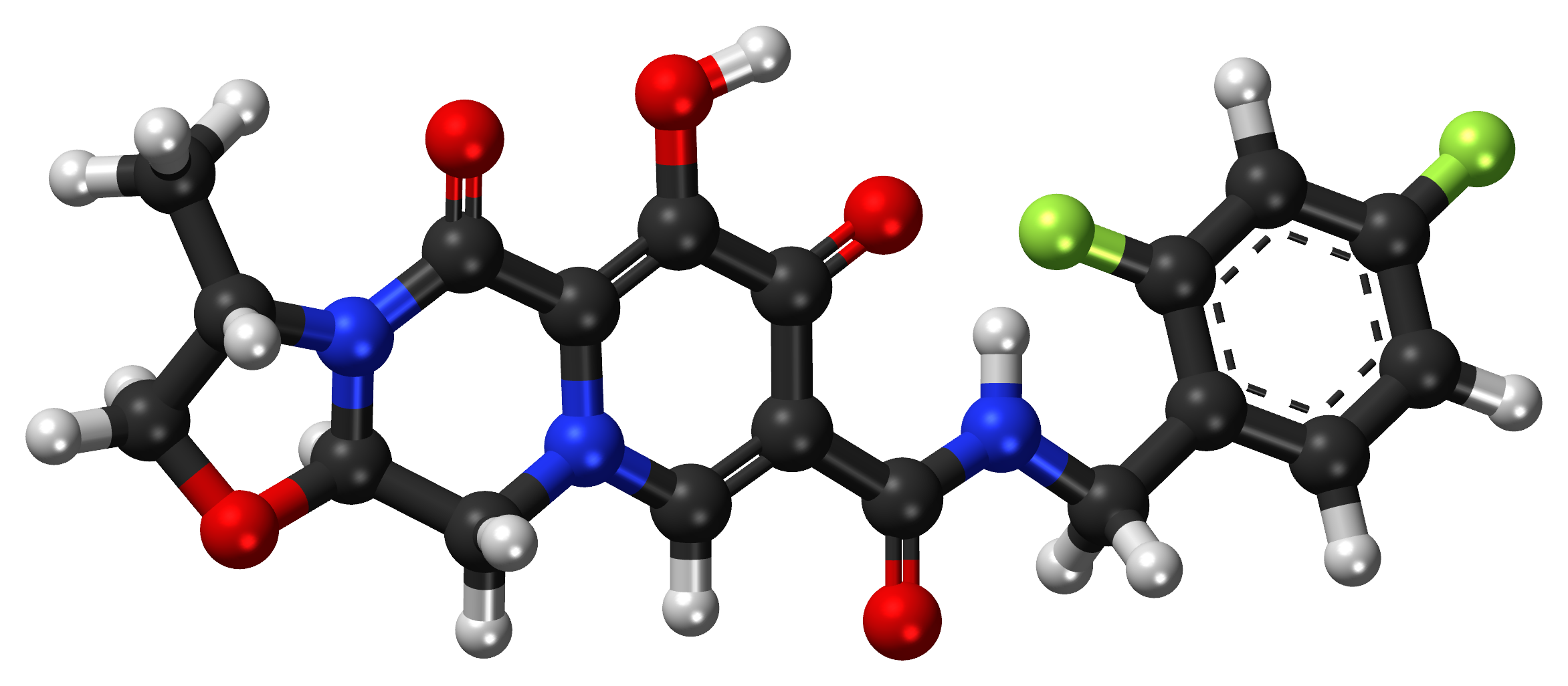

Clinical data
- Pronunciation: /ˌkæboʊˈtɛɡrəvɪər/ KAB-oh-TEG-rə-veer
- Trade names: Vocabria, Apretude
- Other names: S/GSK1265744, GSK744
- AHFS/Drugs.com: Monograph
- MedlinePlus: a621010
- License data: US DailyMed: Cabotegravir
- Pregnancy category: AU: B1
- Routes of administration: By mouth, intramuscular
- ATC code: J05AJ04 (WHO)

Legal status
- Legal status: AU: S4 (Prescription only); CA: ℞-only; US: ℞-only; EU: Rx-only

Pharmacokinetic data
- Protein binding: >99%
- Metabolism: UGT1A1
- Metabolites: glucuronide
- Elimination half-life: tablets: 41 hours injection: 5.6–11.5 weeks
- Excretion: 47% via feces, 27% via urine

Identifiers
- IUPAC name: N-((2,4-Difluorophenyl)methyl)-6-hydroxy-3-methyl-5,7-dioxo-2,3,5,7,11,11a-hexahydro(1,3)oxazolo(3,2-a)pyrido(1,2-d)pyrazine-8-carboxamide
- CAS Number: 1051375-10-0; as salt: 1051375-13-3
- PubChem CID: 54713659; as salt: 46215800
- DrugBank: DB11751; as salt: DBSALT002064
- ChemSpider: 30829503; as salt: 32702138
- UNII: HMH0132Z1Q; as salt: 3L12PT535M
- KEGG: D10548; as salt: D10549
- ChEBI: CHEBI:172944; as salt: CHEBI:172948
- ChEMBL: ChEMBL2403238; as salt: ChEMBL3137330
- CompTox Dashboard (EPA): DTXSID50146982
- ECHA InfoCard: 100.306.452

Chemical and physical data
- Formula: C_{19}H_{17}F_{2}N_{3}O_{5}
- Molar mass: 405.358 g·mol^{−1}
- 3D model (JSmol): Interactive image; as salt: Interactive image
- SMILES: C[C@H]1CO[C@H]2N1C(=O)c3c(c(=O)c(cn3C2)C(=O)NCc4ccc(cc4F)F)O; as salt: [Na+].C[C@H]1CO[C@@H]2CN3C=C(C(=O)NCC4=CC=C(F)C=C4F)C(=O)C([O-])=C3C(=O)N12
- InChI: InChI=1S/C19H17F2N3O5/c1-9-8-29-14-7-23-6-12(16(25)17(26)15(23)19(28)24(9)14)18(27)22-5-10-2-3-11(20)4-13(10)21/h2-4,6,9,14,26H,5,7-8H2,1H3,(H,22,27)/t9-,14+/m0/s1; Key:WCWSTNLSLKSJPK-LKFCYVNXSA-N; as salt: InChI=1S/C19H17F2N3O5.Na/c1-9-8-29-14-7-23-6-12(16(25)17(26)15(23)19(28)24(9)14)18(27)22-5-10-2-3-11(20)4-13(10)21;/h2-4,6,9,14,26H,5,7-8H2,1H3,(H,22,27);/q;+1/p-1/t9-,14+;/m0./s1; Key:AEZBWGMXBKPGFP-KIUAEZIZSA-M

Cabotegravir, sold under the brand name Vocabria among others, is an antiretroviral medication used for the treatment and prevention of HIV/AIDS. It is available in the form of tablets and as an intramuscular injection, as well as in an injectable combination with rilpivirine under the brand name Cabenuva.

It is an integrase inhibitor with a carbamoyl pyridone structure similar to that of dolutegravir.

In December 2021, the U.S. Food and Drug Administration approved cabotegravir for pre-exposure prophylaxis (PrEP) in at-risk people under the brand name Apretude. In September 2023, it was approved for pre-exposure prophylaxis in the European Union.

== Medical uses ==
Cabotegravir in combination with rilpivirine is indicated for the treatment of human immunodeficiency virus type-1 (HIV-1) in adults. The combination injection is intended for maintenance treatment of adults who have undetectable HIV levels in the blood (viral load less than 50 copies/mL) with their current antiretroviral treatment, and when the virus has not developed resistance to non-nucleoside reverse transcriptase inhibitors (NNRTIs) and integrase strand transfer inhibitors. The tablets are used to check whether a person tolerates the treatment before the injection therapy is started.

The two medicines are the first antiretroviral drugs that come in a long-acting injectable formulation.

Cabotegravir (Apretude) is indicated for use in at-risk people weighing at least 35 kilograms (77 lb) for pre-exposure prophylaxis (PrEP) to reduce the risk of sexually acquired HIV.

== Contraindications and interactions ==
Cabotegravir must not be combined with the drugs rifampicin, rifapentine, carbamazepine, oxcarbazepine, phenytoin or phenobarbital, which induce the enzyme UGT1A1. These drugs significantly decrease cabotegravir concentrations in the body and thus may reduce its effectiveness. Additionally, they induce the enzyme CYP3A4, which leads to reduced rilpivirine concentrations in the body.

== Adverse effects ==
The most common side effects of the injectable combination therapy with rilpivirine are reactions at the injection site (in up to 84% of patients) such as pain and swelling, as well as headache (up to 12%) and fever or feeling hot (in 10%). For the tablets, headache and a hot feeling were slightly less frequent. Less common side effects (under 10%) for both formulations are depressive disorders, insomnia, and rashes.

== Pharmacology ==
=== Mechanism of action ===
Cabotegravir is an integrase strand transfer inhibitor. This means it blocks the HIV's enzyme integrase, thereby preventing its genome from being integrated into the human cells' DNA. As this is a necessary step for the virus to replicate, its further spread is hampered.

=== Pharmacokinetics ===
Cabotegravir glucuronide, the main metabolite in human bile and urine

When taken by mouth, cabotegravir reaches highest blood plasma levels after three hours. Taking the drug together with food slightly increases its concentrations in the blood, but this is not clinically relevant. After injection into the muscle, cabotegravir is slowly absorbed into the bloodstream, reaching its highest blood plasma levels after about seven days.

Over 99% of the substance are bound to plasma proteins. The drug is inactivated in the body by glucuronidation, mainly by the enzyme UGT1A1, and to a much lesser extent by UGT1A9. More than 90% of the circulating substance are the unchanged cabotegravir, however. The biological half-life is 41 hours for the tablets and 5.6 to 11.5 weeks for the injection.

Elimination has only been studied for oral administration: Most of the drug is eliminated via the faeces in unchanged form (47%). It is not known how much of this amount comes from the bile, and how much was not absorbed in the first place. (The bile actually contains the glucuronide, but this could be broken up again in the gut lumen to give the parent substance that is observed in the faeces.) To a lesser extent it is excreted via the urine (27%), almost exclusively as the glucuronide.

=== Pharmacogenomics ===
UGT1A1 poor metabolizers have 1.3- to 1.5-fold increased cabotegravir concentrations in the body. This is not considered clinically significant.

== Chemistry ==
Cabotegravir is a white to off-white, crystalline powder that is practically insoluble in aqueous solutions under pH 9, and slightly soluble above pH 10. It is slightly acidic with a pK_{a} of 7.8 for the enolic acid and 11.1 (calculated) for the carboxamide. The molecule has two asymmetric carbon atoms; only one of the four possible configurations is present in the medication.

=== Formulation ===
In studies, the agent was packaged into nanoparticles (GSK744LAP) conferring a biological half-life of 21 to 50 days following a single dose. The marketed injection achieves its long half-life not via nanoparticles but with a suspension of the free cabotegravir acid. The tablets contain cabotegravir sodium salt.

== History ==
Cabotegravir was examined in the clinical trials HPTN 083 and HPTN 084.

== Society and culture ==
=== Legal status ===
In 2020, the Committee for Medicinal Products for Human Use (CHMP) of the European Medicines Agency (EMA) adopted a positive opinion, recommending the granting of a marketing authorization for the medicinal product Vocabria intended for the treatment of human immunodeficiency virus type 1 (HIV-1) infection in combination with rilpivirine injection. The EMA also recommended marketing authorization be given for rilpivirine and cabotegravir injections to be used together for the treatment of people with HIV-1 infection. Cabotegravir was approved for medical use in the European Union in December 2020.

In December 2021, the U.S. Food and Drug Administration (FDA) approved cabotegravir for pre-exposure prophylaxis. The FDA granted the approval of Apretude to Viiv.

Zimbabwe became the first African country to approve the drug in October 2022.

=== Names ===
Cabotegravir is the United States Adopted Name (USAN) and the international nonproprietary name (INN).

== Research ==
=== Pre-exposure prophylaxis ===
In 2020, results for some studies were released showing success in using injectable cabotegravir for long-acting pre-exposure prophylaxis (PrEP) with greater efficacy than the emtricitabine/tenofovir combination being widely used for PrEP at the time.

The safety and efficacy of cabotegravir to reduce the risk of acquiring HIV were evaluated in two randomized, double-blind trials that compared cabotegravir to emtricitabine/tenofovir, a once daily oral medication for HIV PrEP. Trial 1 included HIV-uninfected men and transgender women who have sex with men and have high-risk behavior for HIV infection. Trial 2 included uninfected cisgender women at risk of acquiring HIV.

In trial 1, 4,566 cisgender men and transgender women who have sex with men received either cabotegravir or emtricitabine/tenofovir. The trial measured the rate of HIV infections among trial participants taking daily cabotegravir followed by cabotegravir injections every two months compared to daily oral emtricitabine/tenofovir. The trial showed participants who took cabotegravir had 69% less risk of getting infected with HIV when compared to participants who took emtricitabine/tenofovir.

In trial 2, 3,224 cisgender women received either cabotegravir or emtricitabine/tenofovir. The trial measured the rate of HIV infections in participants who took oral cabotegravir and injections of cabotegravir compared to those who took emtricitabine/tenofovir orally. The trial showed participants who took cabotegravir had 90% less risk of getting infected with HIV when compared to participants who took emtricitabine/tenofovir.
