= HPTN 083 =

2016 clinical drug trial

- full name: Safety and Efficacy Study of Injectable Cabotegravir Compared to Daily Oral Tenofovir Disoproxil Fumarate/Emtricitabine (TDF/FTC), For Pre-Exposure Prophylaxis in HIV-Uninfected Cisgender Men and Transgender Women Who Have Sex With Men
- other names: CT02720094
- sponsor: ViiV Healthcare, Gilead Sciences
- number of participants: 4500
- start: 20 December 2016
- primary completion: June 2020

HPTN 083 is a 2016 clinical trial which compares cabotegravir injections with oral use of Emtricitabine/tenofovir as pre-exposure prophylaxis ("PrEP") for prevention of HIV/AIDS.

The study seeks to test injectable PrEP as a way to remedy adherence for many patients on a daily pill regimen.

HPTN 083 is the first large scale phase III clinical trial of cabotegravir.

In February 2016 researchers presented the results of the ECLAIR study. That study examined cabotegravir and found no serious safety concerns.

The research is a collaboration of Gilead Sciences, HIV Prevention Trials Network, ViiV Healthcare, National Institute of Allergy and Infectious Diseases.

Local study sites will include John H. Stroger Jr. Hospital of Cook County.

On May 18, 2020, HPTN announced that the long-acting injections had been found to be a highly effective treatment.
