= President's Emergency Plan for AIDS Relief =

United States governmental initiative

Logo

The United States President's Emergency Plan For AIDS Relief (PEPFAR) is the global health funding by the United States to address the global HIV/AIDS epidemic and help save the lives of those suffering from the disease. According to the United States government, as of 2023, PEPFAR has saved over 25 million lives, primarily in sub-Saharan Africa.

Launched by U.S. President George W. Bush in 2003, as of August 2024, PEPFAR has provided cumulative funding of $120 billion for HIV/AIDS treatment, prevention, and research since its inception, making it the largest commitment by any nation focused on a single disease in history. PEPFAR is implemented by a combination of U.S. government agencies in over 50 countries and overseen by the Global AIDS Coordinator at the United States Department of State.

PEPFAR supports HIV prevention, testing and antiretroviral treatment, as well as prevention of mother-to-child transmission, care for orphans and vulnerable children, tuberculosis services for people with HIV and broader health-system strengthening. The program initially focused on emergency treatment and prevention, later shifting toward partnership frameworks with recipient governments, epidemic control targets and long-term sustainability. By September 2025, PEPFAR was credited with saving more than 26 million lives and preventing 7.8 million infants from acquiring HIV at birth.

In 2025, the second Trump administration put USAID on a 90-day freeze, initially halting PEPFAR activities, before granting a waiver for HIV medicines and other essential medical services. Only about half of PEPFAR programs were later estimated to have restarted in February. For the July to September 2025 reporting period, the budget cuts led to declines in HIV testing, new diagnoses, treatment enrolment and prevention services, although the overall number of people receiving antiretroviral therapy remained broadly stable.

== History ==
=== History until 2025 ===
PEPFAR began with President George W. Bush and First Lady Laura Bush, and their interests in AIDS prevention, Africa, and what Bush termed "compassionate conservatism." According to his memoir Decision Points the two of them developed a serious interest in improving the fate of the people of Africa after reading Alex Haley's Roots and visiting The Gambia in 1990. In 1998, while pondering a run for the U.S. presidency, he discussed Africa with Condoleezza Rice, his future secretary of state. Rice said that, if elected, working more closely with countries on that continent should be a significant part of his foreign policy. She also told him that HIV/AIDS was a central problem in Africa but that the United States was spending only $500 million per year on global AIDS, with the money spread across six federal agencies, without a clear strategy for curbing the epidemic.

George W. Bush became president in 2001. In April 2003, the United States House of Representatives passed what would become PEPFAR by a 375-41 majority, although with an amendment that one-third of the prevention money had to go to sexual abstinence programs. 20 percent of the overall money would go to prevention, 15% to palliative care, 10% to orphans, and 55% to treatment.

In May 2003, both the House and Senate passed and President Bush signed the U.S. Leadership Against HIV/AIDS, Tuberculosis, and Malaria Act of 2003 (“Global AIDS Act”). This specified a series of broad and specific goals, and alternated between specifying measurable goals and time periods in some areas and delegating authority to the president for identifying goals in other areas. This legislation also established the State Department Office of the Global AIDS Coordinator to oversee all international AIDS funding and programming.

PEPFAR's first phase was emergency response. In its first five years, it allocated $15 billion to 15 countries in sub-Saharan Africa, Asia and the Caribbean, with targets including treatment for 2 million people with HIV, prevention of 7 million new infections, and care for 10 million people affected by HIV/AIDS, including orphans and vulnerable children.

PEPFAR was reauthorized in 2008, with up to $48 billion over five years for HIV/AIDS, tuberculosis and malaria programs. Its second phase emphasized sustainability and cooperation with partner governments, with targets including treatment for at least 3 million people, prevention of 12 million new infections, and care for 12 million people, including 5 million orphans and vulnerable children. Between 2009 and 2012, US teams and host governments signed Partnership Frameworks in 22 countries to define shared responsibilities and priorities. This phase also placed greater emphasis on health-system strengthening, expanded antiretroviral therapy, prevention of mother-to-child transmission and voluntary medical male circumcision.

In 2013, PEPFAR entered a third phase, known as "Controlling the Epidemic", with a focus on reaching the UNAIDS 90-90-90 targets by 2020: 90% of people with HIV diagnosed, 90% of those diagnosed receiving antiretroviral therapy, and 90% of those on treatment achieving viral suppression. The strategy used data to target geographic areas and populations where interventions were expected to have the greatest effect. PEPFAR 3.0 emphasized epidemic control, efficiency, transparency, sustainability, partnerships with national governments and global actors, and protection of human rights, including for LGBT people and other vulnerable groups.

In September 2022, PEPFAR issued "Reimagining PEPFAR's Strategic Direction", setting out a strategy to help end HIV/AIDS as a public health threat by 2030. The plan aimed to reach 95-95-95 treatment targets, reduce new infections through prevention and treatment, address stigma, discrimination, gender-based violence and other inequalities, and shift PEPFAR toward greater long-term sustainability by strengthening the leadership of governments, civil society and local partners. It also emphasized using PEPFAR investments to strengthen public health systems and health security in partner countries.

In 2024, some Republican lawmakers sought to block PEPFAR's reauthorization, alleging that the program promoted abortion.

In January 2025, more than 20 million people living with HIV globally, including 550,000 children under 15, depended on daily services provided with support from the PEPFAR program. Experts from the Center for Global Development estimated that USAID programs annually prevented approximately 1,650,000 deaths from HIV/AIDS.

=== The second Trump presidency ===
==== Funding freeze and waiver ====
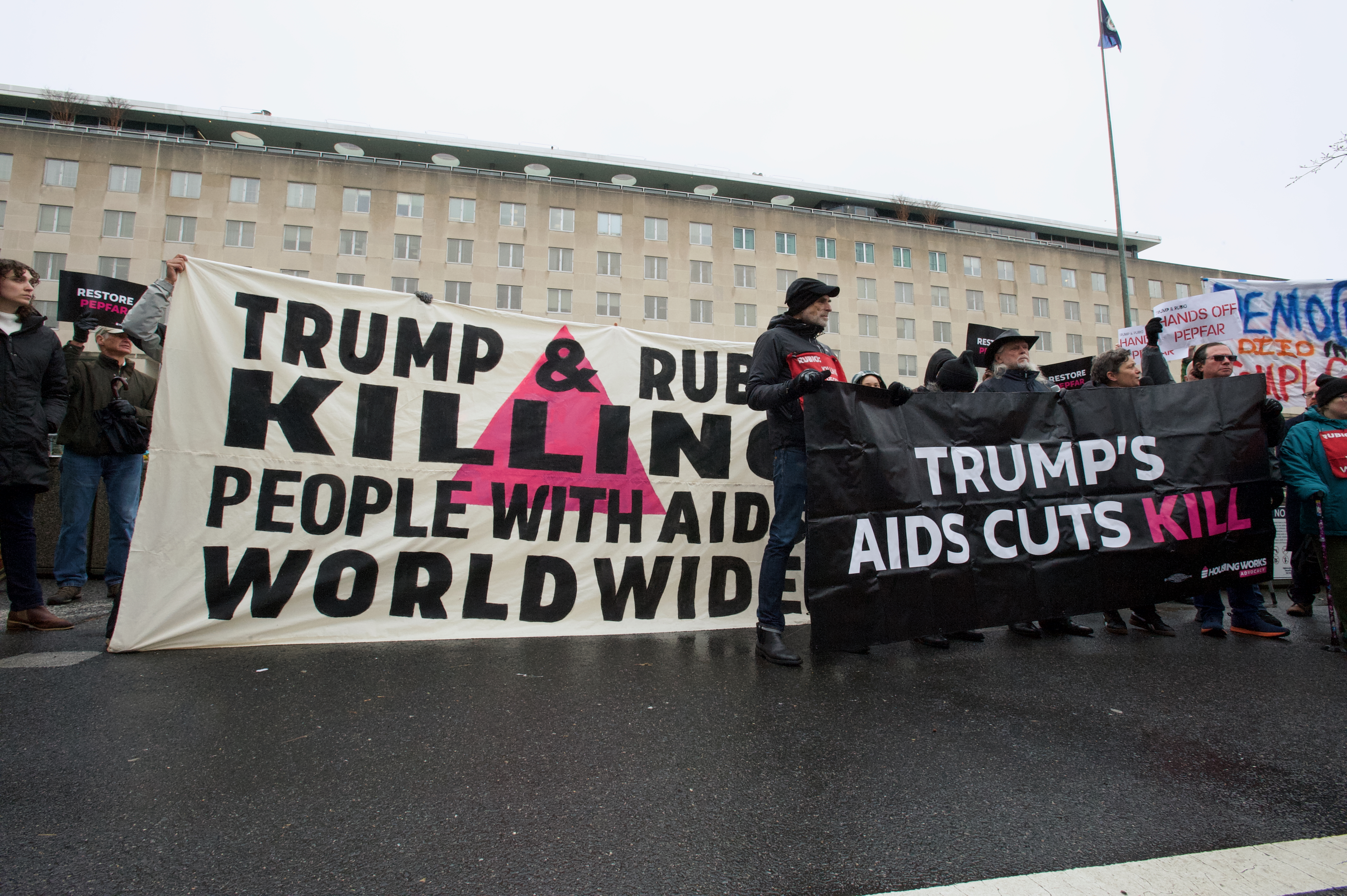
Housing Works protestors outside the State Department building in February 2025

On January 20, 2025, President Trump signed an executive order to withdraw the United States from the World Health Organization and a separate order freezing foreign aid for 90 days. On January 24, the State Department announced a comprehensive freeze on new funding for most foreign aid programs worldwide, with exemptions for emergency food aid and military assistance to Israel and Egypt, but not for PEPFAR. The freeze halted PEPFAR activities and took its computer systems offline.

On January 28, the administration granted a waiver for essential medicines and medical services, including HIV medicines, but it remained unclear whether the waiver covered preventive drugs or additional services provided through PEPFAR.

In February 2025, President Trump's task force "Department of Government Efficiency (DOGE)" had engaged in such actions as large staff layoffs and the seizure of finance systems, which essentially led to the collapse of USAID by April. The disruption to PEPFAR went further than advocated in Project 2025, which instead had praised PEPFAR as "America's most successful aid program."

Later estimates indicated that only about half of PEPFAR programs restarted in February. For example, Zambia had not had its PEPFAR program restarted by mid-April. In July 2025, four congressional aides said that many contracts had remained on hold, that promised waivers had not always translated into resumed services, and that about 50% of budgeted PEPFAR funding had not reached providers.

===== Concern about humanitarian consequences =====
The freeze led to widespread concern about the future of HIV/AIDS programs and the potential reversal of progress made in combating the epidemic. The International AIDS Society warned that the immediate halting of funding to PEPFAR, including a stop-work order for existing grants and contracts, threatened millions of lives. The freeze in HIV relief programs, including PEPFAR, was estimated to jeopardize treatment access for 20 million people, including 500,000 children. A study in The Lancet estimated that the discontinuing PEPFAR could lead to up to 10.75 million new HIV infections and 2.93 million HIV-related deaths, and warned that the impact on low and middle-income countries could be comparable to a global pandemic or a major armed conflict. Another study projected that the suspension of PEPFAR could raise HIV-related deaths to 630,000 per year.

==== July 2025 amendment to exempt PEPFAR from budget cuts ====
In June 2025, the White House requested that Congress pass a rescissions package, or "claw backs", of approximately $8 billion in foreign aid and $1 billion for the Corporation for Public Broadcasting. The House of Representatives passed the cuts as requested. The Senate removed the proposed PEPFAR cuts from the rescissions package, then advanced the revised package in two 51 to 50 procedural votes, with Vice President JD Vance casting the tie-breaking votes. The package could advance with 51 votes because rescissions bills are exempt from the Senate’s usual 60-vote threshold.

On July 15, 2025, Office of Management and Budget Director Russell Vought announced that the "White House is on board with a substitute amendment to [a] rescissions package that would exempt PEPFAR, the global anti-AIDS initiative from cuts."

In a late night session on July 17, the Senate voted 51-48 in favor of the "claw backs" for both USAID and Corporation for Public Broadcasting. The next day, the House of Representatives voted 216 - 213 for the Senate version, leaving $400 million in PEPFAR funding protected.

==== Draft to phase out PEPFAR ====
In July 2025, The New York Times reported that the State Department was working on a draft plan to phase out PEPFAR. During the transition, the plan assumed a 42% cut of PEPFAR's annual budget of $4.7 billion, with Secretary of State Marco Rubio saying this 42% cut was his goal. The plan called for transitioning countries off PEPFAR in two, three, four, or five to eight years, depending on how far along each country was in managing its HIV epidemic. The plan acknowledged that these timelines are "ambitious". There was also discussion of using the Global Fund to Fight AIDS, Tuberculosis and Malaria, although the United States had provided about a third of its funding.

PEPFAR has spent billions of dollars over the years developing electronic records. After the transition, if partner countries fail to maintain records that meet Congressional reporting standards, their funding would end immediately. According to the New York Times, partner countries are unlikely to be able to maintain these records.

==== Withholding of appropriated funds ====
In August and September 2025, media outlets reported that Congress had approved $6 billion for PEPFAR for the 2025 fiscal year, but that the Office of Management and Budget had made only $2.9 billion available for use. The funds were listed as "unallocated" and conditional on further spending plans. The overall scale of the funding reductions remained unclear. The withholding of funds was reportedly reducing the ability of HIV programs to operate, with major limits on HIV prevention, treatment, care and support services.

==== America First global health strategy ====
In September 2025, the second Trump administration released a global health strategy framed around "America First". This strategy focused largely on HIV, tuberculosis and malaria, and called for new bilateral agreements by the end of 2025 with countries previously supported by PEPFAR. Although the strategy was linked to a $4.6 billion US pledge to the Global Fund, it committed only $1 billion for local diagnostic services, treatment and related support for one year, while describing much of the remaining funding as wasteful and subject to rapid reduction.

The 2025 strategy criticized PEPFAR as inefficient, saying that about 40% of PEPFAR's budget supported direct service delivery through health commodities and frontline health workers. It said that, out of a $4.7 billion bilateral budget, about $1 billion went to commodities and delivery, about $600 million to more than 270,000 clinic-based workers, and the remaining $3.1 billion to activities such as training, technical assistance, program management and US government staff. The strategy also argued that implementing partners had become duplicative, with high overhead costs, and that disease-specific programs for HIV/AIDS, tuberculosis, malaria and outbreak response had often operated separately rather than being integrated into national health systems.

===== Bridge funding for South Africa =====
Starting in February 2025, South Africa had laid off approximately 8,000 health care workers due to the USAID freeze and re-start difficulties. However, in October, the Trump administration and the South African government agreed to a transitional period running from October 1, 2025, until March 31, 2026, with $115 million in health aid flowing from the United States to South Africa.

==== Budget cuts consequences ====
In April 2026, the US State Department released PEPFAR data for July to September 2025. The figures showed that treatment access had remained broadly stable despite funding disruptions, with 20.3 million people receiving antiretroviral therapy, compared with 20.4 million in the same quarter of 2024. Other indicators, however, declined. PEPFAR-supported HIV testing fell from 23.7 million to 19.6 million, and new diagnoses dropped from 450,000 to 380,000, raising concerns that reduced testing was causing infections to go undetected rather than reflecting a fall in transmission.

Treatment and prevention indicators also weakened. New antiretroviral therapy enrolments fell by 16%, and the number of pregnant women who tested positive for HIV and received treatment fell by 14%. New initiations of PrEP, preventive HIV medication for people at risk of infection, fell by 41%. The number of adolescent girls and young women completing a PEPFAR prevention package fell by 86%, while the number of children and family members served by the Orphans and Vulnerable Children program also dropped sharply. PEPFAR also stopped reporting some prevention indicators, including services for key and priority populations and voluntary medical male circumcision.

== Focus countries ==
When PEPFAR was signed into law 15 resource-limited countries with high HIV/AIDS prevalence rates were designated to receive the majority of the funding. The 15 "focus countries" were Botswana, Côte d'Ivoire, Ethiopia, Guyana, Haiti, Kenya, Mozambique, Namibia, Nigeria, Rwanda, South Africa, Tanzania, Uganda, Vietnam, and Zambia. Most of the $15 billion for the program was to be spent on these focus countries, $4 billion was allocated for programs elsewhere, and for HIV/AIDS research (the other $1 billion was contributed to the Global Fund).

With the reauthorization of PEPFAR in 2008 there was a shift away from the "focus country" approach by authorizing the development of a Partnership Framework model for regions and countries, with the aim of ensuring long-term sustainability and country leadership. Through bilaterally-funded programs, PEPFAR works in partnership with host nations to support treatment, prevention and care for millions of people in more than 85 countries. Partnership Frameworks provide a 5-year joint strategic framework for cooperation between the U.S. Government, the partner government, and other partners to combat HIV/AIDS in the host country through service delivery, policy reform, and coordinated financial commitments.See the PEPFAR World Wide Activities Map and PEPFAR Dashboard.

== Implementing agencies ==
The AIDS pandemic has been stabilised in Southern and East Africa, with life expectancy rising.

=== Office of the Global AIDS Coordinator ===
Housed in the Department of State, the Office of the Global AIDS Coordinator oversees the implementation of PEPFAR and ensures coordination among the various agencies involved in the U.S global response to HIV/AIDS. United States Ambassadors from the State Department provide essential leadership to interagency HIV/AIDS teams and engage in policy discussions with host-country leaders.

=== United States Agency for International Development ===
An independent federal agency, the United States Agency for International Development receives overall foreign policy guidance from the Secretary of State and is the agency primarily responsible for administering civilian foreign aid. USAID supports the implementation of PEPFAR programs in nearly 100 countries, through direct in-country presence in 50 countries and through seven other regional programs.

=== United States Department of Health and Human Services ===
Under PEPFAR, the United States Department of Health and Human Services (HHS) implements PEPFAR-funded prevention, treatment and care programs through the Centers for Disease Control and Prevention (CDC), National Institutes of Health (NIH), Health Resources and Services Administration (HRSA), Food and Drug Administration (FDA), and Substance Abuse and Mental Health Services Administration (SAMHSA). The Office of Global Health Affairs within HHS coordinates all of the HHS agencies to be sure PEPFAR resources are being used effectively.

=== Centers for Disease Control and Prevention ===
As part of the Department of Health and Human Services, the Centers for Disease Control and Prevention uses PEPFAR funding to implement its Global AIDS Program (GAP). GAP works with highly trained physicians, epidemiologists, public health advisers, behavioral scientists, and laboratory scientists in 29 countries, who are part of USG teams implementing PEPFAR. Through partnerships with host governments, Ministries of Health, NGOs, international organizations, U.S.-based universities, and the private sector, GAP assists with HIV prevention, treatment, and care; laboratory capacity building; surveillance; monitoring and evaluation; and public health evaluation research.

=== United States Department of Defense ===
The United States Department of Defense (DoD) implements PEPFAR programs by supporting HIV/AIDS prevention, treatment, care, strategic information, human capacity development and program/policy development in host military and civilian communities. The DoD HIV/AIDS Prevention Program (DHAPP) is the DoD Executive Agent for the technical assistance, management, and administrative support of the global HIV/AIDS prevention, care and treatment for foreign militaries.

=== United States Department of Commerce ===
The United States Department of Commerce (DoC) provides support for PEPFAR by furthering private sector engagement through public-private partnerships. Housed within DoC, the U.S. Census Bureau assists with data management and analysis, survey support, estimating infections averted and supporting mapping of country-level activities.

=== United States Department of Labor ===
The United States Department of Labor (DoL) implements PEPFAR workplace-targeted projects that focus on the prevention and reduction of HIV/AIDS-related stigma and discrimination. DoL programs (in over 23 countries) consist of three main components: increasing knowledge about HIV/AIDS, implementing workplace policies to reduce stigma and discrimination and building capacity of employers to provide support services.

=== Peace Corps ===
With programs in 73 countries, the Peace Corps is heavily involved in the fight against HIV/AIDS. Peace Corps volunteers provide long-term capacity development support to nongovernmental, community-based, and faith-based organizations as they provide holistic support to people living with and affected by HIV/AIDS.

== Programs ==
The stabilisation of the AIDS pandemic in South Africa

The U.S. President's Emergency Plan for AIDS Relief: Five-Year Strategy report from 2009 outlines the PEPFAR strategy and programs for the fiscal years 2010-2014.

=== Prevention ===
To slow the spread of the epidemic, PEPFAR supports a variety of prevention programs: the ABC approach (Abstain, Be faithful, and correct and consistent use of Condoms); prevention of mother to child transmission (PMTCT) interventions; and programs focusing on blood safety, injection safety, secondary prevention ("prevention with positives"), counseling and education.

Initially, a recommended 20% of the PEPFAR budget was to be spent on prevention, with the remaining 80% going to care and treatment, laboratory support, antiretroviral drugs, TB/HIV services, support for orphans and vulnerable children (OVC), infrastructure, training, and other related services. Of the 20% spent on prevention, one third, or 6.7% of the total, was to be spent on abstinence-until-marriage programs in fiscal years 2006 through 2008, a controversial requirement (see below). The other two thirds was allotted for the widespread array of prevention interventions described above, including counseling, education, injection safety, blood safety and condoms.

The 2008 reauthorization of PEPFAR eliminated the 20% recommendation for prevention efforts, including the requirement for abstinence programs.

=== Treatment ===
In addition to providing antiretroviral therapy (ART), PEPFAR supports prevention and treatment of opportunistic infections, as well as services to prevent and treat malaria, tuberculosis, waterborne illness, and other acute infections. PEPFAR supports training and salaries for personnel (including clinicians, laboratorians, pharmacists, counselors, medical records staff, outreach workers, peer educators, etc.), renovation and refurbishment of health care facilities, updated laboratory equipment and distribution systems, logistics and management for drugs and other commodities. This is intended to ensure the sustainability of PEPFAR services in host countries, enabling long-term management of HIV/AIDS.

PEPFAR-supported care and treatment services are implemented by a wide array of U.S.-based and international groups and agencies. Among the largest "Track 1.0" (treatment) partners are Harvard University, Columbia University's International Center for AIDS Care & Treatment Programs (ICAP), the Elizabeth Glaser Pediatric AIDS Foundation (EGPAF), and the AIDSRelief consortium of Catholic Relief Services.

=== Care ===
For those who have already been infected with HIV/AIDS, PEPFAR provides HIV counseling, resources for maintaining financial stability, etc. Special care is given to orphans and vulnerable children (OVCs) and services are provided that meet the unique needs of women and girls, including victims of sex trafficking, rape, abuse, and exploitation (see fact sheet on Gender and HIV/AIDS). Finally, the Emergency Plan works closely with country leaders, military groups, faith-based organizations, etc. in an attempt to eliminate stigma.

=== Health systems strengthening ===
PEPFAR has directly and indirectly contributed to the health systems strengthening of recipient countries including improving laboratory capacity as well as improving monitoring and evaluation including introduction of the electronic medical record systems. Another area of health system strengthening that PEPFAR has contributed to is its ability to increase the pandemic response to other infectious diseases such as COVID-19. Research by Anand Reddi and colleagues has documented the effectiveness and sustainability of PEPFAR programs by emphasizing the need for integrated approaches to HIV care that can strengthen overall health systems in resource limited settings.

=== Antiretroviral local manufacturing ===
The U.S. government is supporting African production of antiretrovirals (ARVs) to address the continent's HIV epidemic. In July 2024, PEPFAR plans to expand its purchase of ARVs from local suppliers to serve 2 million African patients.

=== Tuberculosis ===
Tuberculosis continues to be the primary cause of death among people living with HIV globally. Since 2003, PEPFAR has helped lower tuberculosis incidence indirectly by strengthening overall population health and expanding access to care in regions heavily affected by HIV. In 2018, PEPFAR accelerated efforts focused specifically on tuberculosis prevention, including broad implementation of routine symptom screening, increased availability of TB diagnostic testing, and provision of preventive therapy to all eligible individuals with HIV.

Between 2003 and 2024, PEPFAR’s combined indirect and targeted efforts are estimated to have prevented about 11.0 million tuberculosis cases (11,040,549; 95% CI: 5,546,614–16,568,420) and roughly 2.1 million TB-related deaths (2,136,192; 95% CI: 1,093,622–3,264,782) among people living with HIV. Approximately 42% of these prevented cases were projected to have occurred during 2020–2024. Within this five-year period, about one-third (32%) of the reductions were linked to direct TB-focused interventions. Notably, the share attributable to these targeted measures rose substantially, from 18% in 2021 to 46% in 2024.

== Results ==
The results of the program include:

- As of December 2024, PEPFAR has saved 26 million lives.
- As of September 30, 2024, PEPFAR supported antiretroviral treatment for 20.6 million people worldwide including 566,000 children versus the 20.47 million people worldwide on treatment in 2023.
- Since 2003, PEPFAR averted an estimated 11 million cases of tuberculosis and 2.1 million tuberculosis-related deaths among persons with HIV.
- In 2024, PEPFAR supported 2.5 million people newly enrolled on PrEP to prevent HIV infection. In 2023, PEPFAR supported 1.95 million people on antiretroviral pre-exposure prophylaxis.
- PEPFAR supported 2.3 million adolescent girls and young women through the DREAM HIV prevention services in FY 2024 versus 2.5 million in FY2023. PrEP initiations in DREAM geographies was 475,000 clients in FY 2024.
- PEPFAR directly supported 83.8 million people with HIV testing services, an increase of 12 million more people since 2023 in which 71 million people were tested in fiscal year 2023.
- PEPFAR supported antiretroviral drug prophylaxis to prevent mother-to-child transmission (MTCT), resulting in 7.8 million infants born HIV-free by September 2025.
- PEPFAR directly supported 6.6 million orphans, vulnerable children and their caregivers in fiscal year 2024, a slight decrease from 2023.
- PEPFAR directly supported approximately 35.1 million voluntary male circumcision procedures worldwide cumulatively from 2017 through Dec 2024, an increase of 2.7 million in FY 2024 from 2023.

The U.S. is the first and largest donor to the Global Fund to Fight AIDS, Tuberculosis, and Malaria. To date, the U.S. has provided more than $7 billion to the fund.

Of the estimated 8 million individuals in low- and middle-income countries who currently receive treatment, nearly 6.8 million receive support through PEPFAR bilateral programs, the Global Fund, or both.

There is additional evidence in the published literature that funding towards PEPFAR vis-a-vis antiretroviral therapy also affirmed maternal and child health in addition to HIV treatment outcomes

=== Indirect results ===
PEPFAR has also been associated with broader economic and political effects in recipient countries. One assessment found that countries receiving PEPFAR support had higher GDP per capita growth than they would have been expected to achieve without the program. The State Department also stated that PEPFAR-supported countries saw a larger reduction in political instability from 2004 to 2011 than non-PEPFAR countries in the same region.

US health assistance has also been used to support military partnerships abroad. According to the State Department, PEPFAR had created 19 military-to-military collaborations, mostly in sub-Saharan Africa, including in countries where the United States cooperated with local militaries against Islamist armed groups.

== Accountability and funding ==
Since the start of PEPFAR in 2003, the program has utilized multi-year appropriations. PEPFAR reports to Congress on an annual basis, providing programmatic and financial data as required by law. The Fourteenth Annual Report to Congress on the President's Emergency Plan for AIDS Relief is available on the official PEPFAR website, as are more specific reports, financial information and other information.

Global AIDS funding is provided in the Foreign Operations and Labor, Health and Human Services appropriations bills, which, if the process goes smoothly, are agreed to by the House and Senate in advance of the federal fiscal year beginning October 1. The Office of the Global AIDS Coordinator (OGAC) budgets according to the allocations provided by Congress and the policy of the Administration. Funding figures by program are reported to Congress by the Office of the Global AIDS Coordinator.

For FY 2013, President Obama requested $6.42 billion, including more than $4.54 billion for bilateral HIV/AIDS programs and $1.65 billion for the Global Fund. For FY 2014, President Obama requested $6.73 billion, including more than $4.88 billion for bilateral HIV/AIDS programs and $1.65 billion for the Global Fund.

For FY 2024, President Biden requested at least $4.7 billion for the PEPFAR program in its annual budget request to Congress in addition to funding for the multilateral Global Fund to Fight AIDS, Tuberculosis and Malaria.

PEPFAR was exempt from the Mexico City Policy.

== Funding data ==
Annual data on the PEPFAR budget, spending by budget code, and impact estimates are available online at PEPFAR Panorama Spotlight. Funding amounts to specific in-country implementing mechanisms and partners are only available for the year 2013 onward.

In 2008, funding data was obtained by the Center for Public Integrity from PEPFAR's own information system COPRS. The data were obtained after CPI sued the U.S. State Department to gain access to the data. The data were analyzed by the HIV/AIDS Monitor team at the Center for Global Development, which also share the full dataset.

== Criticism ==
=== Controversial requirements ===
Some critics of PEPFAR feel that American political and social groups with moral rather than public health agendas are behind several requirements of PEPFAR, pointing to the mandates that one-third of prevention spending in 2006–2008 be directed towards abstinence-until-marriage programs and that all funded organizations sign an anti-prostitution pledge. This pledge requires all organizations that receive PEPFAR funding to have a policy that explicitly opposes prostitution and sex trafficking which some activists compared to a loyalty oath. A number of AIDS organizations felt such a policy would alienate their efforts to reduce HIV contraction rates among sex workers.

In 2005, it was reported from United Nations' envoy leader for HIV/AIDS in Africa Stephen Lewis that the Bush administration's abstinence policy may have contributed to a shortage of condoms in Uganda.

In 2013, the U.S. Supreme Court ruled that the requirement violated the First Amendment's prohibition against compelled speech in Agency for International Development v. Alliance for Open Society International, Inc. According to a study presented at the 19th Conference on Retroviruses and Opportunistic Infections in 2015, the $1.3 billion that the U.S. government spent on programs to promote abstinence in sub-Saharan Africa had no significant impact.

The requirement for prevention spending was lifted with the PEPFAR reauthorization in 2008, but some critics worry that some funds could still be spent on abstinence programs. The Center for Health and Gender Equity and Health GAP outline their criticism of PEPFAR on a website known as PEPFAR Watch. The previous 33% earmark has since been replaced by a requirement that if more than 50% of PEPFAR funds are allocated to non-abstinence promotion measures, the US Global AIDS Coordinator must report to Congress. However, the new reporting requirement continues to emphasize abstinence and fidelity to the exclusion of comprehensive approaches, such as those that include education about male and female condoms. This can cause a chilling effect for organizations receiving PEPFAR funding, who may censor their prevention activities and fall short of providing comprehensive HIV prevention services to women, men, and young people.

PEPFAR also does not fund needle exchange programs, which are widely regarded as effective in preventing the spread of HIV.

=== Conditions ===
Many have argued that PEPFAR's emphasis on direct funding from the United States to African governments (bilateral programs) have been at the expense of full commitments to multilateral programs such as the Global Fund. Reasons given for this vary, but a major criticism has been that this enables the U.S. "to maximize its leverage with other countries through the funds available for distribution" since the "Global Fund and other multilateral venues do not possess the same top-down leverage as does the United States in demanding fundamental national-level reforms". However, since the inception of PEPFAR there has been a shift away from strictly bilateral funding to more multilateral programs.

=== Recruitment of locals ===
PEPFAR has been criticized for having a negative impact on the health systems in regions receiving its funding through its recruitment practices. Although Congress made attempts to limit its impact by prohibiting "topping off" salaries and limiting funding for healthcare worker training (thereby eliminating per diems as a method of augmenting salaries), PEPFAR funded programs effectively paid its local staff up to a hundred times more than that of the local healthcare structure.

Rather than strictly through salaries, program staff received benefits such as housing and education subsidies. Countries, already stressed by the number of trained physicians and nurses emigrating to western nations, have seen the presence of PEPFAR programs significantly decrease the number of skilled medical professionals willing to work within the domestic healthcare infrastructure. As a result, the overall health of these communities are placed in jeopardy, but funds, physicians, and nurses are diverted to combat HIV/AIDS exclusively within the framework of PEPFAR.

=== Investigations ===
On June 15, 2011, the Department of Health and Human Services Office of Inspector General (OIG) published a report critical of the Centers for Disease Control and Prevention's (CDC's) administration of PEPFAR funds. The report read in part: "Our review found that CDC did not always monitor recipients' use of [PEPFAR] funds in accordance with departmental and other Federal requirements.... [M]ost of the award files did not include all required documents" to demonstrate proper monitoring. On the November 19, 2012, the OIG published a report critical of the CDC Namibia Office's monitoring of the use of PEPFAR funds.

== See also ==
- Global health funding by the United States
- National Commission on AIDS
- Office of National AIDS Policy
- Presidential Advisory Council on HIV/AIDS
- President's Commission on the HIV Epidemic
- President's Malaria Initiative
- TRIPS Agreement
