= Jerry Coovadia =

South African doctor (1940–2023)

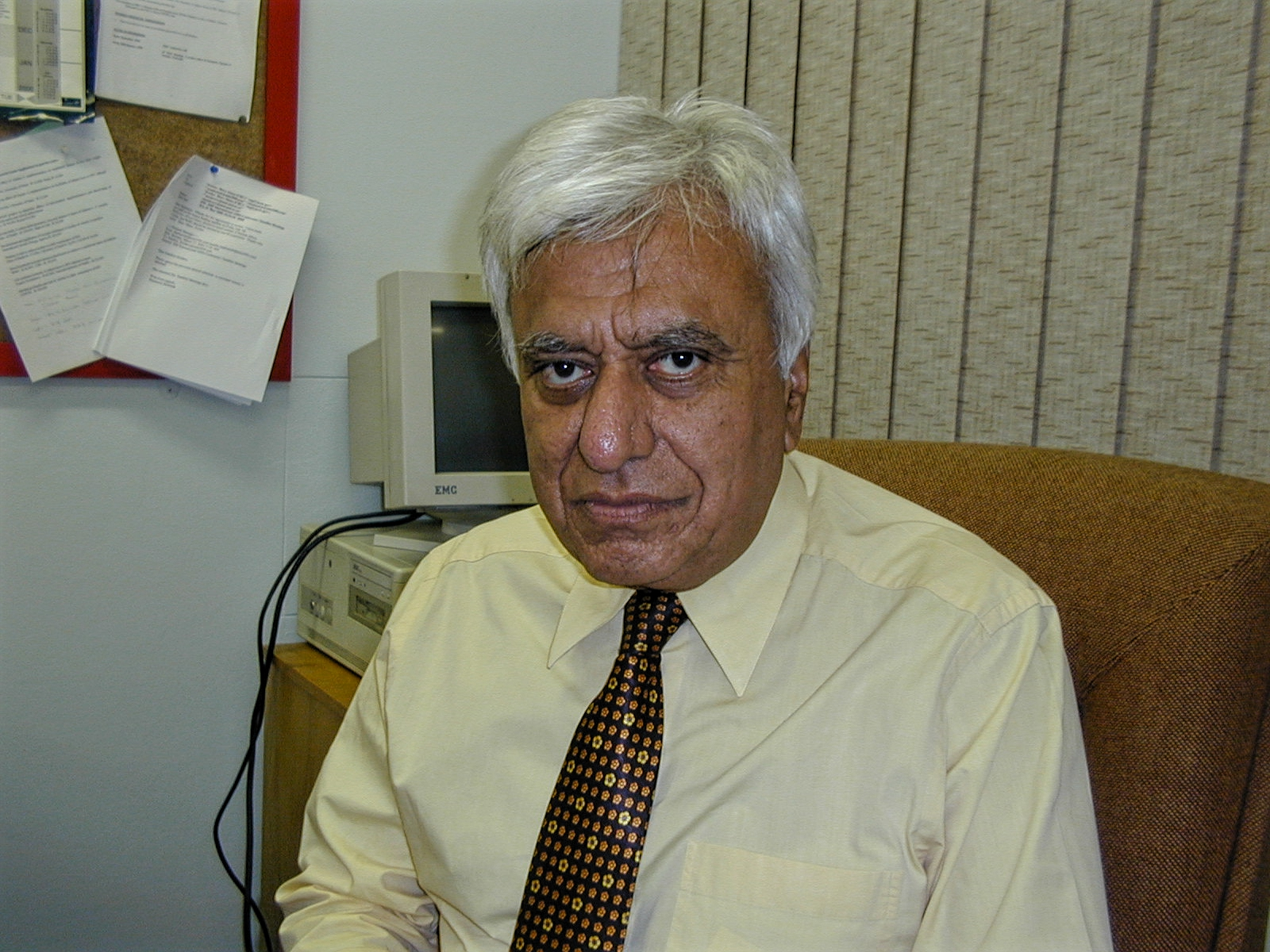
- Born: Hoosen Mahomed Coovadia; 2 August 1940; Durban, Natal Province; Union of South Africa
- Died: 4 October 2023 (aged 83); Durban, South Africa
- Spouse: Zubeida Hamed (m. 1969)
- Children: Imraan Coovadia; Anuschka Coovadia

Hoosen Mahomed "Jerry" Coovadia (2 August 1940 – 4 October 2023) was a South African medical doctor, academic, and former anti-apartheid activist. He was previously the Victor Daitz Emeritus Chair and Professor at the University of KwaZulu-Natal Nelson Mandela School of Medicine.

== Biography ==
Hoosen Mahomed Coovadia was born in Durban, South Africa, on 2 August 1940. His grandparents had emigrated from India to South Africa in the 1880s. Coovadia attended St. Anthony's, a Catholic school, and later Sastri College, a high school.

Coovadia briefly attended Medical School at the University of Natal, which at that time was racially stratified, before moving to Bombay, India for medical training. He was accepted at the Grant Medical College at the University of Bombay. After graduating, he returned to Durban to work at the King Edward VIII Hospital. He worked in pediatrics at the University of Natal and the Colleges of Medicine of South Africa and then went to the University of Birmingham, earning his M.Sc. in Immunology in 1974. He then rejoined the Department of Pediatrics at the University of Natal, receiving an M.D. in 1978.

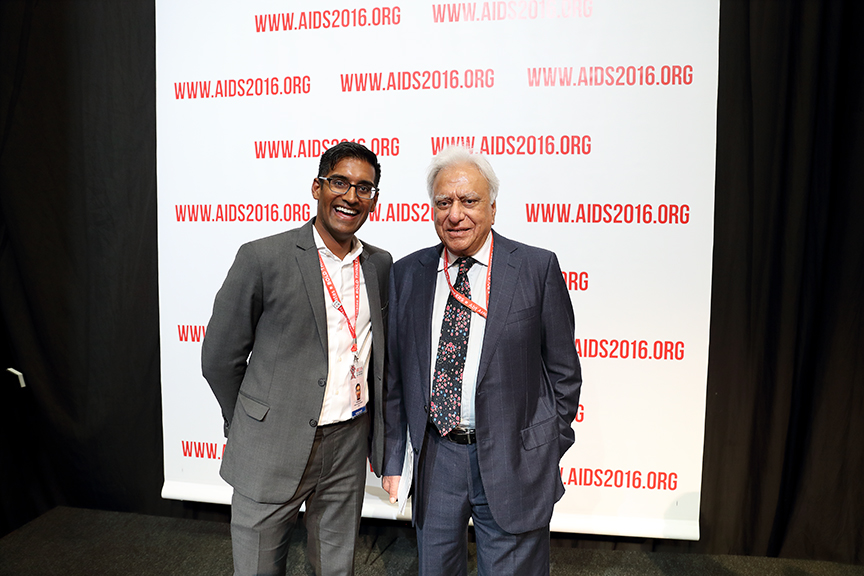
Prof Coovadia and Anand Reddi at the World AIDS Conference 2016 in Durban, South Africa

He was appointed associate professor at the University of Natal in 1982 and Ad Hominem Professor in 1986. From 1990 to 2000, he served as professor and head of paediatrics and child health at the University of Natal. He has since served as the Victor Daitz Chair in HIV/AIDS Research, Director of Biomedical Science at the centre for HIV/AIDS Networking (HIVAN), and the scientific director of the Doris Duke Medical Research Institute at the Nelson Mandela School of Medicine at the University of KwaZulu Natal.

Coovadia was involved in the leadership of the United Democratic Front (UDF) in the 1970s. He became chairman of the Commission on Maternal and Child Health, created by the Mandela government. He served on the executive of the National Medical and Dental Association (NAMDA), formed in 1982. In the 1980s, Coovadia focused on issues of malnutrition and childhood diseases, but then expanded his focus to include AIDS, particularly mother-to-child transmission. He was a vocal critic of the AIDS policies of Thabo Mbeki's government and campaigned actively for the use of antiretroviral therapy. In 2000, he was co-chair of the International AIDS Conference in Durban.

After Professor Coovadia's death, President Cyril Ramaphosa of South Africa said, “Our nation’s loss will be felt globally, but we can take pride at and comfort from the emergence of a giant of science and an icon of compassion and resilience from our country.” Professor Coovadia mentored a number of notable students including Professor Salim Abdool Karim, Professor Quarraisha Abdool Karim and the Fulbright Scholar Anand Reddi.

Dr. Coovadia died on 4 October 2023 at his home in Durban after a period of declining health.

== Awards and honors ==
- 1999 Star of South Africa for contribution to democracy and health from President Nelson Mandela
- 2000 Nelson Mandela Award for Health and Human Rights
- 2000 U.S. National Academy of Medicine Elected Member
- 2004 Founding member of the Academy of Science of South Africa
- 2004 Academy of Science of South Africa, Science for Society Gold Medal
- 2013 AAAS Scientific Freedom and Responsibility Award

== Works ==
- Host Allergic Response Variation in Children with Measles Infection, University of Natal, Durban, 1977
- John Ehiri (3 October 2009). "Impact of HIV on the Health of Women Children and Families in Less Developed Countries". Maternal and Child Health: Global Challenges, Programs, and Policies. Springer Science & Business Media. pp. 270–. ISBN 978-0-387-89245-0.
