= Victor Kande =

Congolese physician

Victor Kande Betu Kumeso
- Education: University of Kinshasa
- Known for: Sleeping sickness research
- Scientific career
- Workplaces: Ministry of Health; University of Kinshasa

Victor Kande Betu Kumeso is a Congolese physician who is an expert in African trypanosomiasis. He works at the Programme National de Lutte contre la Trypanosomiase Humaine Africaine at the University of Kinshasa.

== Early life and education ==
Kande studied medicine. At the age of 27, he was the only medical doctor for 11,000 people in Bandundu Province.

== Research ==
Kande is known as the father of sleeping sickness. He was made the Director of the Democratic Republic of the Congo sleeping sickness programme and works with the Ministry of Public Health. African trypanosomiasis disproportionately impacts people in the Democratic Republic of the Congo. The disease is caused by Trypanosoma brucei and usually presents in the chronic form. He investigates the epidemiology of sleeping sickness. He was one of the first to report of the resurgence of sleeping sickness, calling for more aid, inter-country collaboration and improved healthcare facilities and treatment options.

Kande has been the principal investigator for several studies of new treatments for African trypanosomiasis. He investigated the efficacy and safety of DB289, which is administered as a dication prodrug to Pentamidine. He also demonstrated a high failure rate with Melarsoprol and investigated the use of Pafuramidine. In a country with few passable roads or hospitals, Kande and his colleagues recruited 400 people with late stage Trypanosoma brucei for a trial of Fexinidazole sponsored by the Drugs for Neglected Diseases initiative. The study demonstrated that fexinidazole is an effective treatment for sleeping sickness. The work was published in The Lancet and led to Kande being described by Richard Lehman (primary care physician) the 'true hero of medicine'. Fexinidazole received a positive opinion from the European Medicines Agency under Article 58 in November 2018 and was registered in the Democratic Republic of Congo in December 2018.

Kande is currently investigating SCYX-7158 (acoziborole) as a single-dose treatment for Human African Trypanosomiasis (HAT) in a clinical trial sponsored by the Drugs for Neglected Diseases initiative.

He looks for innovative partnerships between the private and public sector, such as the partnership that led to the delivery of fexinidazole by DNDi. In 2018 Kande was awarded the Anne Maurer Cecchini award of the Geneva Health Forum.
