= Heinz Hänel =

German biologist (born 1955)

- Born: November 3, 1955 (age 70); Offenbach am Main, West Germany
- Education: Goethe University Frankfurt
- Known for: Development of fexinidazole
- Scientific career
- Fields: Biology · Zoology · Parasitology
- Workplaces: Hoechst AG; benfovir AG; Oxy5 OncoMedical AG

Heinz Hänel (born November 3, 1955, in Offenbach am Main) is a German biologist, zoologist, and parasitologist. He is recognized as one of the key developers of fexinidazole, the first oral medication for African sleeping sickness, a breakthrough that significantly contributed to the near-eradication of this deadly tropical disease. I In addition to his scientific research, Hänel worked in the pharmaceutical industry for several decades, focusing on the development of anti-infectives and antifungals, as well as quality control. In 1981, he discovered a new spider species in the Malaysian rainforest—Crassignatha haeneli—which was later named in his honor.

He currently serves on the executive board (as Chief Development Officer) of benfovir AG and Oxy5 OncoMedical AG, where he is researching the potential of oxythiamine for treating cancer and viral diseases.

== Life and career ==
=== Education and scientific background ===
After completing high school in 1974 and serving 15 months in the military, Hänel began studying biology at Johann Wolfgang Goethe University in Frankfurt am Main, graduating in 1981. During his studies, he gained practical experience at Hoechst AG and conducted research in Mexico, Australia, and Malaysia. While on a research trip to the Malaysian rainforest in 1981, he discovered a previously unknown species of spider, Crassignatha haeneli, which belongs to the Symphytognathidae family and was scientifically described by Jörg Wunderlich in 1988.

He earned a doctorate in zoology in 1985 with a thesis on bee parasites and received a scholarship from the German Research Foundation (DFG) in recognition of his scientific contributions. He habilitated in zoology in 1994 and was appointed honorary professor at Goethe University Frankfurt in 2001.

=== Research and pharmaceutical career ===
Hänel joined Hoechst AG in 1984, where he held various leadership roles in research and development. From 1989 to 1991, he headed the antifungal research division and later became global head of development for the antibiotic levofloxacin. He also played a significant role in the development of a ciclopirox-based nail lacquer for the treatment of nail fungus.

=== Fexinidazole and the fight against African Sleeping Sickness ===
One of Hänel's most notable achievements is his leading role in the development of fexinidazole, a drug that revolutionized the treatment of African sleeping sickness (Trypanosoma brucei infection). Previously, the disease was treated with highly toxic intravenous drugs that were difficult to administer under African healthcare conditions. Recognizing the potential of fexinidazole – a nitroimidazole derivative suitable for oral administration – Hänel spearheaded its development.

The drug was ultimately commercialized by Sanofi in partnership with the Drugs for Neglected Diseases initiative (DNDi). In 2018, the European Medicines Agency approved fexinidazole as the first fully oral treatment for both stages of the disease. Its ease of use enabled large-scale treatment efforts, and in 2021, the WHO announced that African sleeping sickness was on the verge of elimination. Hänel's work has been hailed as a landmark contribution to global health.

=== Current research in oncology and virology ===
Since 2024, Hänel has served as CDO of benfovir AG and Oxy5 OncoMedical AG. His current focus is on oxythiamine, a promising compound that inhibits the TKTL1 metabolic pathway, thereby hindering cancer cell growth. He is also investigating its antiviral properties for the treatment of serious viral infections.

== Scientific and professional involvement ==
Hänel is actively involved in various scientific organizations and initiatives:

- Member of the New York Academy of Sciences
- Advisory Board member for the journal Mycoses (1993–2000)
- Advisory Board member for Bosch/Syntegon (since 2004)
- Chairman of the Neeff Science Prize for Students (since 2007)
- Chairman of the Alumni Board at Goethe University (2008–2023)

He has also served as a senior advisor for strategic biotech initiatives, including Mitodicure and Aprofol AG.

== Honors and awards ==
Hänel has received numerous accolades for his contributions to science and medicine, particularly for his work on fexinidazole:

- Cross of Merit 1st Class of the Order of Merit of the Federal Republic of Germany (2021)
- Award for Social Responsibility for initiating the development of the first oral treatment for African sleeping sickness
- Procter & Gamble Environmental Protection Award
- Recognition for discovering a fungal pathogen (Metarhizium anisopliae) capable of eradicating termite colonies without chemical insecticides

== Key publications and patents ==
- Scholarly contributions to parasitology, mycology, and tropical medicine
- Development of Batrafen, Levofloxacin (Tavanic), and Fexinidazole
- Field research on ants and parasites in Malaysia, including the discovery of Crassignatha haeneli

== Personal life ==
Hänel has been married since 1984 and is the father of three children.
