= Pécoul =

Pécoul is a surname. Notable people with the surname include:

- Bernard Pécoul (fl. 1983–present), founder of the Drugs for Neglected Diseases initiative
- Charles-Pierre Pécoul (fl. 1784), official

- Marguerite-Charlotte Pécoul (1726–1826), daughter of Charles-Pierre Pécoul
