= Nifurtimox/eflornithine =

Combination drug

Combination of
- Nifurtimox: antiparasitic agent
- Eflornithine: antiparasitic agent

Nifurtimox/eflornithine is a combination of two antiparasitic drugs, nifurtimox and eflornithine, used in the treatment of African trypanosomiasis (sleeping sickness). It was developed by Drugs for Neglected Diseases initiative and partners and is included in the World Health Organization's Model List of Essential Medicines. It is distributed in a kit with material to treat four patients, which weighs 39 kg and has a volume of 170 dm^{3}, making the transport to remote rural hospitals a logistical challenge.

A treatment regimen known as nifurtimox-eflornithine combination treatment (NECT) is used in second stage gambiense African trypanosomiasis throughout Africa where the disease is endemic. The regimen involves slow infusion of 400 mg of eflornithine every 12 hours for 7 days combined with 15 mg/kg of nifurtimox orally three times a day for 10 days. The World Health Organization 2019 guidelines still recommend NECT in cases of advanced disease, but otherwise advise the use of fexinidazole.
