= Melarsoprol =

Medication used to treat sleeping sickness

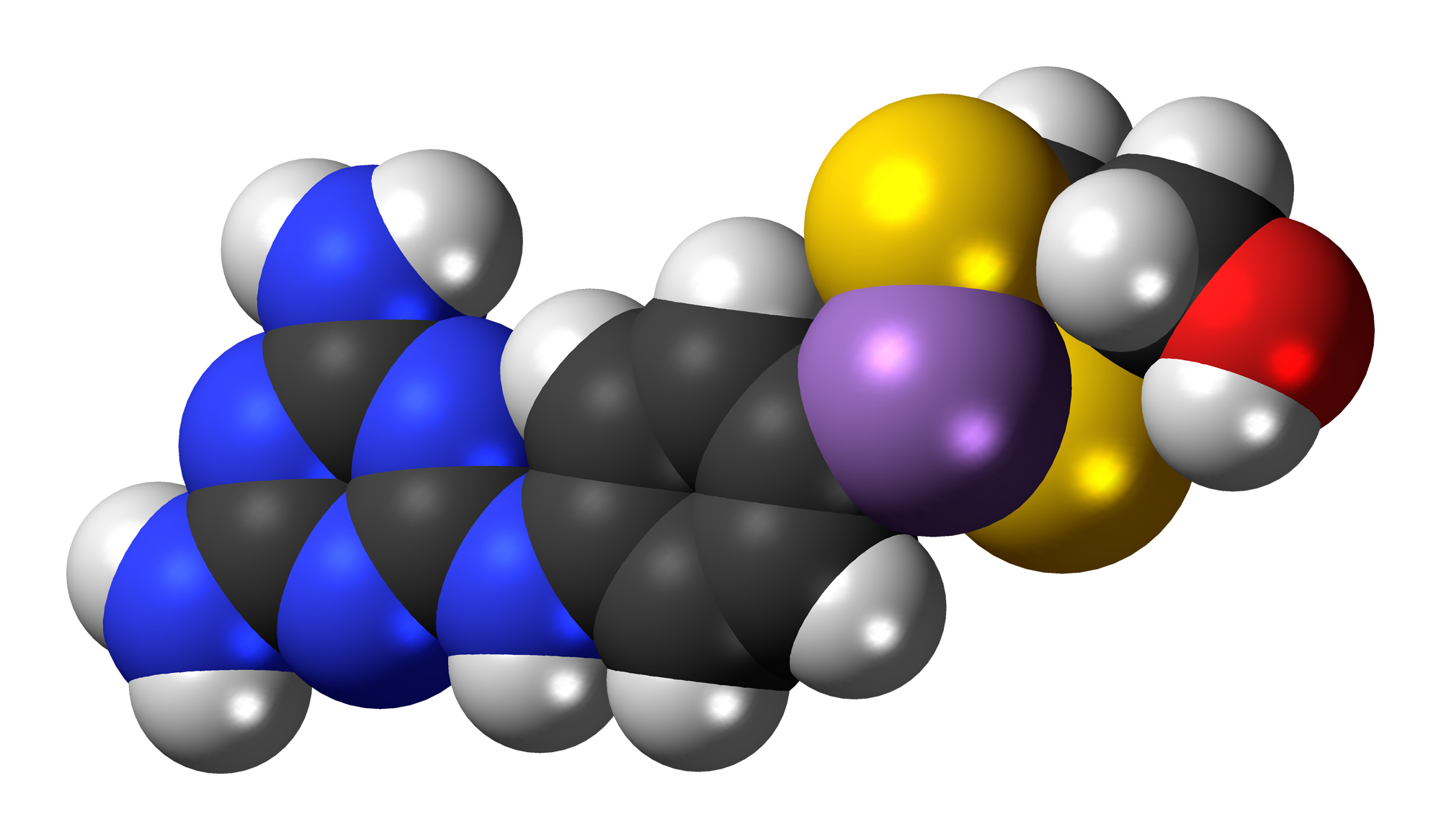

Clinical data
- Trade names: Arsobal
- Other names: Mel B, Melarsen Oxide-BAL
- AHFS/Drugs.com: Micromedex Detailed Consumer Information
- Routes of administration: IV
- ATC code: P01CD01 (WHO) QP51AD04 (WHO)

Pharmacokinetic data
- Elimination half-life: 35 hours
- Excretion: Kidney

Identifiers
- IUPAC name: (2-{4-[(4,6-Diamino-1,3,5-triazin-2-yl)amino]phenyl}-1,3,2-dithiarsolan-4-yl)methanol
- CAS Number: 494-79-1
- PubChem CID: 10311
- ChemSpider: 9889
- UNII: ZF3786Q2E8
- KEGG: D00832
- ChEMBL: ChEMBL166
- CompTox Dashboard (EPA): DTXSID90862033
- ECHA InfoCard: 100.007.086

Chemical and physical data
- Formula: C_{12}H_{15}AsN_{6}OS_{2}
- Molar mass: 398.33 g·mol^{−1}
- 3D model (JSmol): Interactive image
- SMILES: OCC1S[As](SC1)c3ccc(Nc2nc(nc(n2)N)N)cc3
- InChI: InChI=1S/C12H15AsN6OS2/c14-10-17-11(15)19-12(18-10)16-8-3-1-7(2-4-8)13-21-6-9(5-20)22-13/h1-4,9,20H,5-6H2,(H5,14,15,16,17,18,19); Key:JCYZMTMYPZHVBF-UHFFFAOYSA-N

Melarsoprol is an arsenic-containing medication used for the treatment of sleeping sickness (African trypanosomiasis). It is specifically used for second-stage disease caused by Trypanosoma brucei rhodesiense when the central nervous system is involved. For Trypanosoma brucei gambiense, eflornithine or fexinidazole is usually preferred. It is effective in about 95% of people. It is given by injection and is known by patients as "fire in the veins".

Melarsoprol has a high number of side effects. Common side effects include brain dysfunction, numbness, rashes, and kidney and liver problems. About 1–5% of people die during treatment, although this is tolerated due to sleeping sickness itself having a practically 100% mortality rate when untreated. In those with glucose-6-phosphate dehydrogenase (G6PD) deficiency, red blood cell breakdown may occur. It has not been studied in pregnancy. While its mechanism of action is not fully understood, its covalent binding to trypanothione to form the toxic Mel T complex is thought to play a large role.

Melarsoprol has been used medically since 1949. It is on the World Health Organization's List of Essential Medicines. In regions of the world where the disease is common, melarsoprol is provided for free by the World Health Organization. It is not commercially available in Canada or the United States. In the United States, it may be obtained from the Centers for Disease Control and Prevention, while in Canada it is available from Health Canada.

== Medical uses ==
People diagnosed with trypanosome-caused disease should be treated with an anti-trypanosomal. Treatment is based on stage, 1 or 2, and parasite, T. b. rhodesiense or T. b. gambiense. In stage 1 disease, trypanosomes are present only in the peripheral circulation. In stage 2 disease, trypanosomes have crossed the blood-brain barrier and are present in the central nervous system.

The following are considerable treatment options:

Melarsoprol is a treatment used during the second stage of the disease. So far, it is the only treatment available for late-stage T. b. rhodesiense.

Due to high toxicity, melarsoprol is reserved only for the most dangerous cases. Other agents associated with lower toxicity levels are used during stage 1 of the disease. The approval of the nifurtimox-eflornithine combination therapy (NECT) in 2009 for the treatment of T. b. gambiense limited the use of melarsoprol to the treatment of second-stage T. b. rhodesiense.

Failure rates of 27% in certain African countries have been reported. This was caused by both drug resistance and additional mechanisms that have not yet been elucidated. Resistance is likely due to transport problems associated with the P2 transporter, an adenine-adenosine transporter. Resistance can occur with point mutations within this transporter. Resistance has been present since the 1970s.

In August 2024, the World Health Organization recommended fexinidazole, developed by the Drugs for Neglected Diseases initiative and partners to replace melarsoprol as the first-line treatment for sleeping sickness caused by T. b. rhodesiense.

=== Available forms ===
Two arsenic-containing stereoisomers exist in a 3:1 molar ratio. Since melarsoprol is insoluble in water, dosage occurs via a 3.6% propylene glycol intravenous injection. To avoid the risk of injection site reactions, melarsoprol must be given slowly.

Melarsoprol used for the treatment of African trypanosomiasis with CNS involvement is given under a complicated dosing schedule. The dosing schedule for children and adults is 2–3.6 mg/kg/day intravenously for three days, then repeated every seven days for a total of three series. To monitor for relapse, follow-up is recommended every six months for at least two years.

=== Pregnancy and breastfeeding ===
Currently, melarsoprol is not recommended for use in pregnant women. The World Health Organization suggests that treatment be deferred until immediately after delivery since the effects of the medication on the developing fetus have not yet been established.

Lactation guidelines associated with melarsoprol have not yet been established.

== Cautions ==
Numerous warnings must be examined before melarsoprol treatment can be initiated. Prior to initiation, the following must be noted: glucose-6-phosphate dehydrogenase deficiency, kidney or liver disease, cardiac problems (high blood pressure, irregular beating of the heart or arrhythmias, any damage to the heart muscles and potential signs of heart failure), preexisting nervous system disorders, and any signs of leprosy.

Routine laboratory testing is needed before and after melarsoprol initiation. Laboratory parameters for both therapeutic effects and toxic effects need to be evaluated.

Blood analysis is used to detect the presence of trypanosomes. An evaluation of the cerebrospinal fluid via a lumbar puncture is also used to determine an individual's white blood count and level of protein. These are diagnostic criteria such that the presence of trypanosomes, an elevated white blood count greater than five per microliter, or a protein content greater than 40 mg are considered abnormal and initiation should be considered. Continuous cerebrospinal fluid evaluation should be repeated every six months for at least three years in individuals that have undergone melarsoprol treatment.

To assess potential concerns related to toxicity, the following should be completed: a complete blood count, an assessment of electrolyte levels, liver and kidney function tests, and a urinalysis to detect the appearance, concentration and content of the urine.

Melarsoprol should be given using glass syringes (if they can be reliably sterilized). The propylene glycol it contains is capable of dissolving plastic.

== Side effects ==
Although melarsoprol cures about 96% of people with late stage disease, its toxicity limits its use. About 1–5% of people die during treatment. As a toxic organic compound of arsenic, melarsoprol is a dangerous treatment that is typically only administered by injection under the supervision of a licensed physician. Notable side effects are similar to arsenic poisoning. Among clinicians, it is colloquially referred to as "arsenic in antifreeze". Severe and life-threatening adverse reactions are associated with melarsoprol. It is known to cause a range of side effects including convulsions, fever, loss of consciousness, rashes, bloody stools, nausea and vomiting. In approximately 5–10% of cases, it causes encephalopathy. Of those, about 50% die due to encephalopathy-related adverse reactions. Additional potentially serious side effects of melarsoprol include damage to the heart, presence of albumin in the urine that could be associated with kidney damage, and an increase in blood pressure.

== Resistance ==
Drug resistance evolution is encouraged by the use of diminazene for nagana.

== Pharmacology ==
=== Mechanism of action ===
Melarsoprol is a prodrug, a complex of melarsen oxide (a melamine derivative of phenylarsonous acid) with dimercaprol (also known as British anti-Lewisite, or BAL). It is metabolized to melarsen oxide in the body, which then forms a toxic compound known as Mel T, through binding with trypanothione, (a spermidine-glutathione adduct that replaces glutathione in trypanosomes). While Mel T is a competitive inhibitor of trypanothione reductase, research suggests this is not sufficient to explain the rapid cell death of the trypanosome parasites. Some research has also discredited the theory that the disruption of glycolysis is essential to its mechanism of action.

While the exact mechanism of action of melarsoprol has not been determined beyond the formation of Mel T, it has been suggested that this complex is implicated in several cytotoxic processes, including inhibition of DNA synthesis and increasing susceptibility to oxidative stress. This follows from the fact that trypanothione itself plays a role in the proper function of a variety of biochemical pathways.

=== Pharmacokinetics ===
The half-life of melarsoprol is less than one hour, but bioassays indicate a 35-hour half-life. This is commonly associated with pharmacologic agents that have active metabolites. One such metabolite, melarsen oxide, reaches maximum plasma levels about 15 minutes after melarsoprol injection. Melarsoprol clearance is 21.5 ml/min/kg and the half-life of melarsen oxide is approximately 3.9 hours.

== Society and culture ==
Melarsoprol is produced by Sanofi and under an agreement with the WHO, it donates melarsoprol to countries where the disease is common.

Melarsoprol was used to treat a patient with second-stage African trypanosomiasis on season 1 episode 7 "Fidelity" of the medical drama House MD.
