= Human trypanosomiasis =

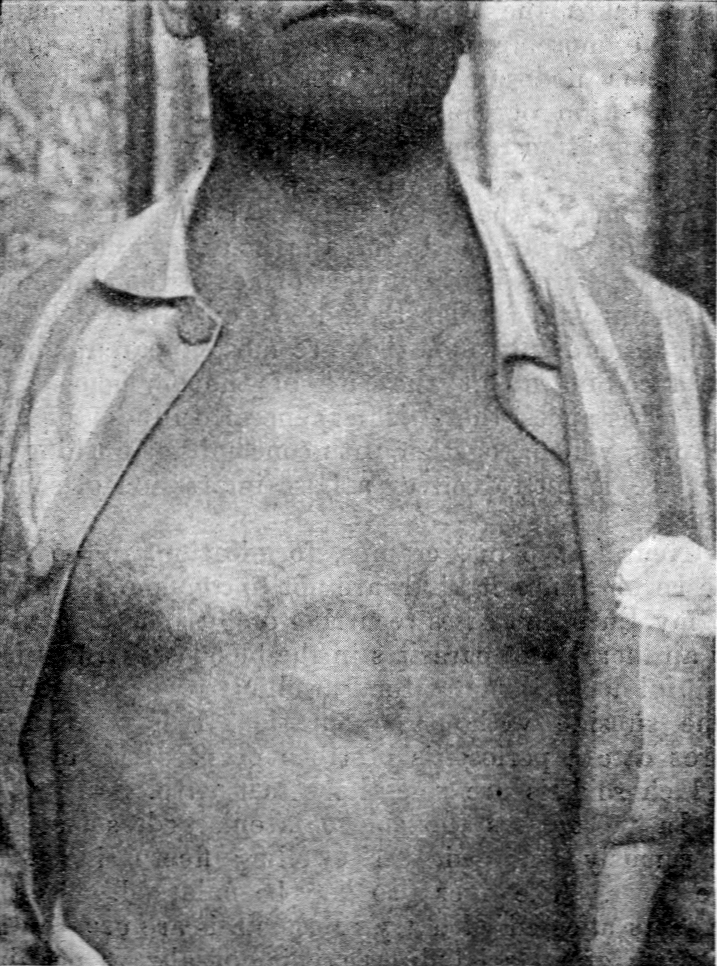
- Rash of human trypanosomiasis.
- Specialty: Dermatology

Human trypanosomiasis is a cutaneous condition caused by several species of trypanosomes, with skin manifestations usually being observed in the earlier stages of the disease as evanescent erythema, erythema multiforme, and edema, especially angioedema.

== See also ==
- Trypanosomiasis
- Skin lesion
