= African trypanosomiasis =

Parasitic disease also known as sleeping sickness

- Other names: Sleeping sickness, African sleeping sickness
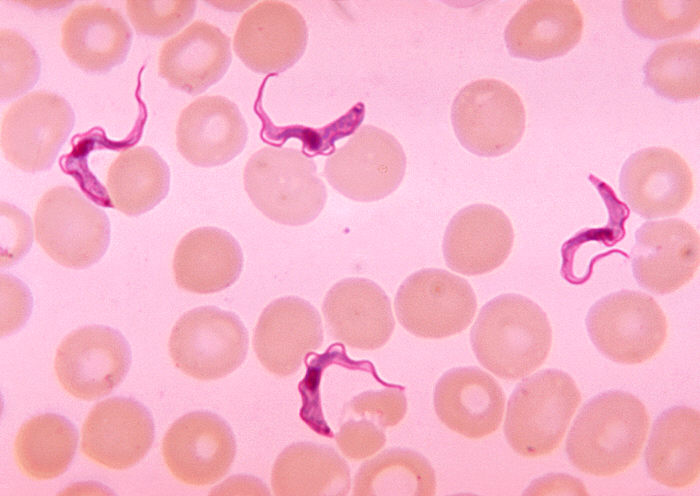
- Trypanosoma forms in a blood smear
- Specialty: Infectious disease
- Symptoms: Stage 1: Fever, headache, itchiness, joint pain Stage 2: Insomnia, confusion, ataxia
- Complications: Multiple organ dysfunction syndrome
- Usual onset: 1–3 weeks post exposure
- Types: Trypanosoma brucei gambiense and Trypanosoma brucei rhodesiense
- Causes: Trypanosoma brucei spread by tsetse flies
- Diagnostic method: Blood smear, lumbar puncture
- Prevention: Avoiding bite of tsetse flies, including insect repellent and pest control
- Medication: Fexinidazole, pentamidine, suramin, melarsoprol, eflornithine, nifurtimox
- Prognosis: Fatal without treatment
- Frequency: 583 (2024)
- Deaths: 3,500 (2015)

African trypanosomiasis is an insect-borne parasitic infection of humans and other animals caused by the protozoan species Trypanosoma brucei, which is transmitted by the bite of an infected tsetse fly. Human African trypanosomiasis (HAT) is also known as sleeping sickness. Humans are infected by two subspecies of T. brucei: T. brucei gambiense is primarily transmitted between humans and causes over 92% of cases, while T. brucei rhodesiense is zoonotic, with animals such as cattle serving as reservoirs.

During the first stage of the disease, T. brucei parasites replicate in the blood and lymph, causing fever, headache, itchiness, and joint pains about one to three weeks after the bite. Weeks to months later, the parasite crosses the blood–brain barrier and the second stage begins with neurological symptoms including confusion, poor coordination, numbness, and trouble sleeping. Without treatment, African trypanosomiasis almost always results in death. Diagnosis involves detecting the parasite in a blood smear or lymph node fluid. A lumbar puncture is often needed to tell the difference between first- and second-stage disease. T. brucei gambiense causes chronic infection that can take months to years to develop symptoms, while T. brucei rhodesiense infection causes symptoms within weeks to months.

Prevention involves avoiding tsetse fly bites, for example by the use of insect repellents and protective clothing. Vector control measures, such as spraying insecticides and releasing sterilized tsetse flies in endemic areas, have significantly reduced the incidence of disease. Screening the at-risk population with blood tests for T. brucei gambiense can prevent the development of severe disease. Treatment is easier when the disease is detected early and before neurological symptoms begin. The use of pentamidine or suramin treats the first stage of T. brucei infection, but if the disease progresses to the neurological stage, dosages of eflornithine or a combination of nifurtimox and eflornithine are the preferred treatment. Fexinidazole is a more recent treatment that can be taken by mouth for either stage of T. brucei gambiense. While melarsoprol works for both types of sleeping sickness, it is typically used only for T. brucei rhodesiense, due to its serious side effects.

The disease occurs regularly in some regions of sub-Saharan Africa with the population at risk being about 70 million in 36 countries. An estimated 11,000 people are currently infected with 2,800 new infections in 2015. In 2024, there were 583 confirmed cases recorded. In 2015, it caused around 3,500 deaths, down from 34,000 in 1990. More than 80% of these cases are in the Democratic Republic of the Congo. Three major outbreaks have occurred in recent history: one from 1896 to 1906 primarily in Uganda and the Congo Basin, and two in 1920 and 1970, in several African countries. It is classified as a neglected tropical disease. Other animals, such as cows, may carry the disease and become infected in which case it is known as nagana or animal trypanosomiasis.

== Signs and symptoms ==
African trypanosomiasis symptoms occur in two stages: 1) the hemolymphatic stage and 2) the neurological or meningoencephalitic stage. The hemolymphatic stage is to the period when parasites are present in the blood and lymphatic system, prior to central nervous system involvement. The neurological stage, also called the meningoencephalitic stage, begins when Trypanosoma parasites cross the blood–brain barrier and invade the central nervous system. In addition to the hemolymphatic stage neurological symptoms can still present themselves, resulting in a difficulty in distinguishing the two stages based on clinical features alone.

The disease has been reported to present with atypical symptoms in infected individuals who originate from non-endemic areas (e.g., travelers). In such persons, the infection is said to present mainly as fever with gastrointestinal symptoms (e.g., diarrhea and jaundice) and with lymphadenopathy rarely developing. An earlier study noted a greater dominance of the neurological symptoms, and also reported the presence of jaundice. The reasons for this are unclear and may be genetic or linked to a lack of previous exposure to forms of trypanosomes not pathogenic to humans. The low number of such cases may also have skewed findings. These symptomatological differences have resulted in delayed or missed diagnosis.

=== Trypanosomal ulcer ===
Systemic disease is sometimes presaged by a trypanosomal ulcer developing at the site of the infectious fly bite within 2 days of infection. The ulcer is most commonly observed in T. b. rhodesiense infection and rarely in T. b. gambiense infection, where ulcers are more common in persons from non-endemic areas.

=== Hemolymphatic stage ===
The incubation period is 1–3 weeks for T. b. rhodesiense, and longer (but less precisely characterised) in T. b. gambiense infection. The first/initial stage, known as the hemolymphatic stage, is characterized by non-specific, generalised symptoms like: fever (intermittent), headaches (severe), joint pains, itching, weakness, malaise, fatigue, weight loss, lymphadenopathy, and hepatosplenomegaly.

Diagnosis may be delayed due to the vagueness of initial symptoms. The disease may also be mistaken for malaria (which may occur as a co-infection).

==== Intermittent fever ====
Fever is intermittent, with attacks lasting from a day to a week, separated by intervals of a few days to a month or longer. Episodes of fever become less frequent throughout the disease.

==== Lymphadenopathy ====
Invasion of the circulatory and lymphatic systems by the parasite is associated with severe swelling of lymph nodes, often to tremendous sizes. Posterior cervical lymph nodes are most commonly affected; however, axillary, inguinal, and epitrochlear lymph node involvement may also occur. Winterbottom's sign is a clinical finding involving swollen lymph nodes at the base of the skull or along the back of the neck, particularly characteristic of T. b. gambiense infections.

==== Other features ====
Those affected may additionally present with: skin rash, haemolytic anaemia, hepatomegaly and abnormal liver function, splenomegaly, endocrine disturbance, cardiac involvement (e.g., pericarditis and congestive heart failure), and ophthalmic involvement.

Ulcer of human African trypanosomiasis

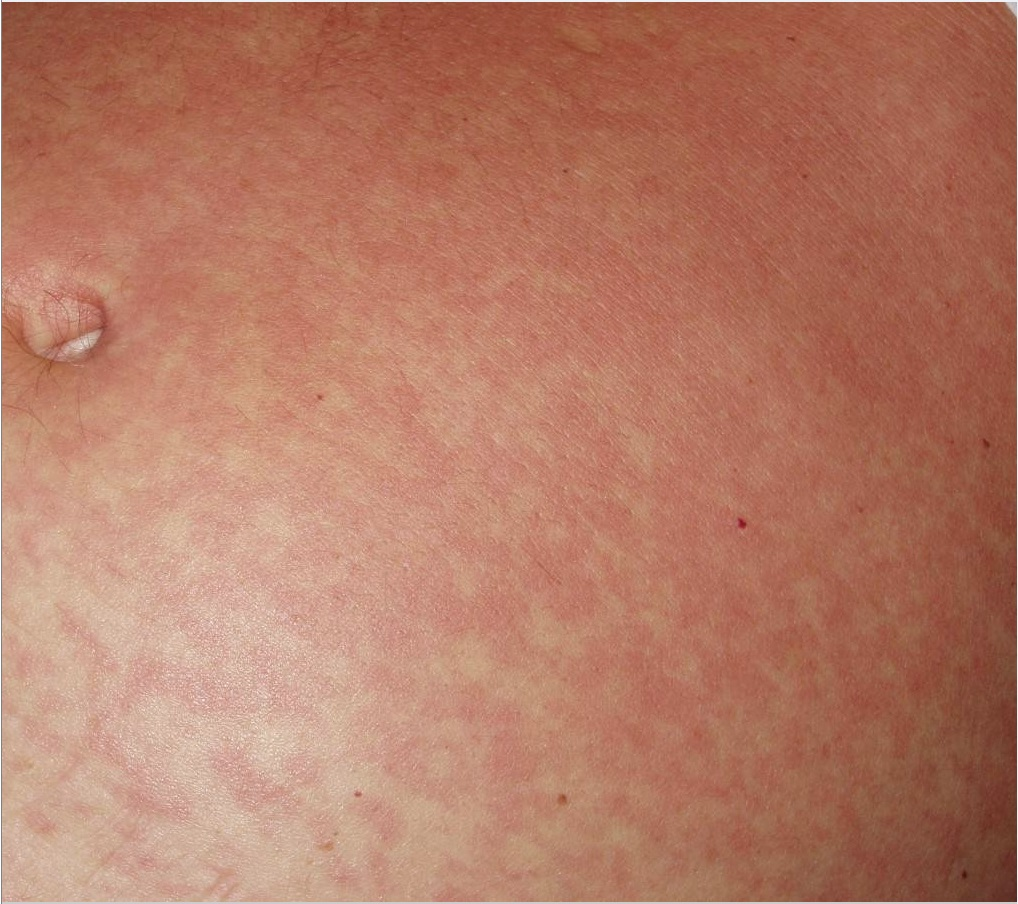
Typical fine-spotted pink rash of acute African trypanosomiasis on the skin of the abdomen ("trypanid rash")

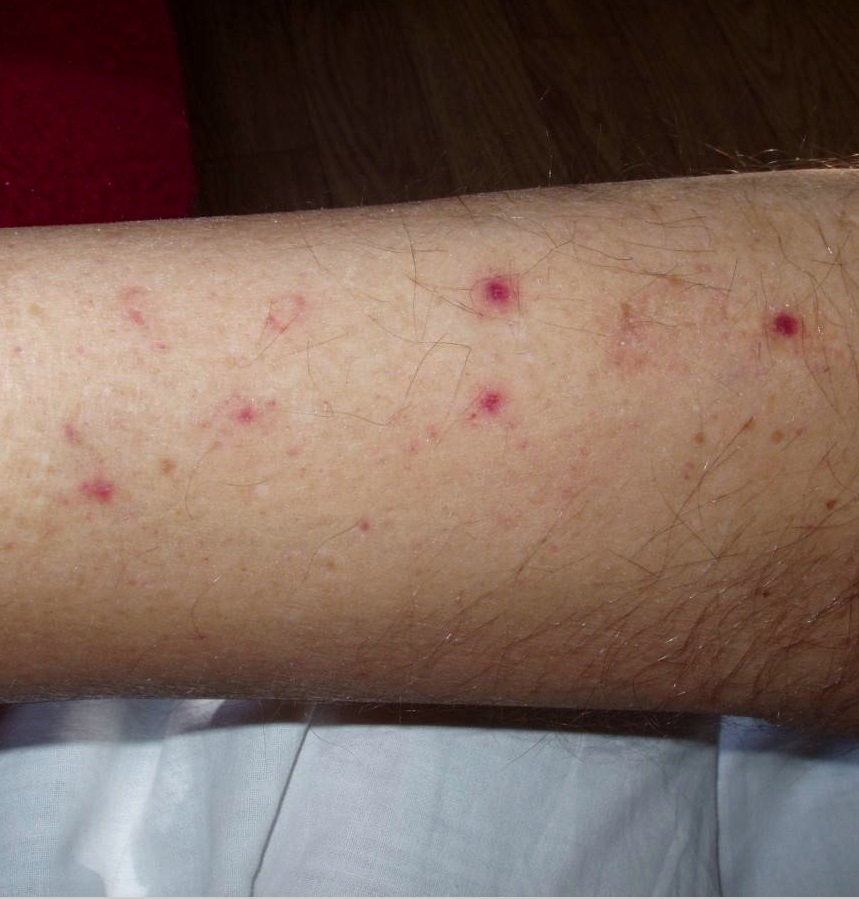
Numerous spots of bleeding into the skin of the leg in a person infected with T. b. rhodesiense

=== Neurological stage ===
The second stage of the disease, the neurological stage (also called the meningoencephalic stage), begins when the parasite invades the central nervous system by passing through the blood–brain barrier. Progression to the neurological stage occurs after an estimated 21–60 days in case of T. b. rhodesiense infection, and 300–500 days in case of T. b. gambiense infection.

In actuality, the two stages of African trypanosomiasis—the hemolymphatic stage and the neurological stage—often overlap, and their clinical features can be nonspecific or evolve gradually, making it difficult to distinguish them based on symptoms alone. While signs such as enlarged lymph nodes and intermittent fever are more characteristic of the early stage, and neuropsychiatric symptoms such as sleep disturbances, confusion, or motor abnormalities suggest progression to the later stage, these indicators are not definitive. Consequently, to accurately determine the stage of the disease, specifically to determine central nervous system involvement, a lumbar puncture is performed to analyze the cerebrospinal fluid (CSF). The detection of trypanosome parasites in the CSF confirms that the infection has progressed to the neurological stage. This assessment is crucial because treatment protocols differ depending on whether or not the central nervous system has been affected. In the later stage, more intensive drugs that can cross the blood-brain barrier are necessary to eliminate the parasites from the brain and spinal cord.

==== Sleep disorders ====
Sleep-wake disturbances are a leading feature of the neurological stage and give the disease its common name of "sleeping sickness". Infected individuals experience a disorganized and fragmented sleep-wake cycle. Those affected experience sleep inversion resulting in daytime sleep and somnolence, and nighttime periods of wakefulness and insomnia. Additionally, those affected also experience episodes of sudden sleepiness.

This sleeping impairment is also related to disruptions of circadian rhythm, the body's internal clock, which regulates rhythmic behavior, including metabolic patterns in cells. Studies indicate T. brucei alters the oscillatory expression of clock genes in the suprachiasmatic nuclei (SCN), among other brain regions, charged with circadian regulation. This alteration of expression may be moderated by the host's immune responses, such as parasitic activity and inflammation resulting from elevated TNF-α levels.

==== Neurological symptoms ====
Neurological symptoms include: tremor, general muscle weakness, hemiparesis, paralysis of a limb, abnormal muscle tone, gait disturbance, ataxia, speech disturbances, paraesthesia, hyperaesthesia, anaesthesia, visual disturbance, abnormal reflexes, seizures, and coma. Parkinson-like movements might arise due to non-specific movement disorders and speech disorders.

==== Psychiatric symptoms ====
Individuals may exhibit psychiatric symptoms, which can sometimes dominate the clinical presentation. These symptoms include aggressiveness, apathy, irritability, psychotic reactions and hallucinations, anxiety, emotional lability, confusion, mania, attention deficit, and delirium.

=== Advanced disease ===
Without treatment, the disease is invariably fatal, with progressive mental deterioration leading to coma, systemic organ failure, and death. An untreated infection with T. b. rhodesiense will cause death within months whereas an untreated infection with T. b. gambiense will cause death after several years. Damage caused in the neurological stage is irreversible.

=== Sleep ===
Circadian rhythm, an intrinsic clock that mediates rhythm of biological function, is affected by African trypanosomiasis. T. brucei alters the rhythmic activity of clock genes in basal forebrain, hypothalamus, thalamus, locus coeruleus, brainstem, etc. . Both parasitic activity and inflammation induced by elevated TNF-α levels impairs oscillatory expression within the host. These disruptions to regulate circadian gene expression are evidenced to contribute to key symptoms of African trypanosomiasis, such as fragmented sleep, temperature changes, and abnormal hormone release.

Most organisms implement internal timing mechanisms to regulate the homeostasis of the body with the environment. These mechanisms, called circadian clocks, regulate pathways in core processes, where in mammals the primary circadian clock is the suprachiasmatic Nucleus (SCN). The SCN's ability to serve as the organism's primary internal clock and send signals to adjacent clocks to collectively synchronize them can be affected by a variety of factors. Certain factors that induce inflammation, such as viruses, bacteria, or parasites, can disrupt the interactions between a cell's circadian clock and the central pacemaker. In the case of Trypanosoma brucei, the parasite attacks the internal clock of the cells.

African sleeping sickness mainly disrupts the sleep/wake cycle alongside body temperature and hormonal regulation. After treatment, the sleep-wake cycle can revert to normal, indicating that the parasites are responsible for circadian rhythm alteration rather than neuronal damage.

Sleeping sickness disrupts both sleep timing and architecture. The underlying causes were investigated in a mouse model where T. brucei infected mice had a reduced ability to maintain REM sleep and an inability to respond homeostatically to sleep deprivation. There were also reduced electrophysiological responses, electrical activity produced by the nervous system and heart, and behavioral changes. This presented a likelihood to T. brucei altering homeostatic adenosine signaling in addition to the inflammatory responses generated from the infection.

Inflammation modifies circadian physiology through altered homeostatic regulation. This is promoted by the response of the SCN to proinflammatory cytokines that most notably causes stage shifts in locomotor rhythms, seen in mice.

In a studied mouse model, the response to a T. brucei infection was analyzed, where inflammatory molecules such as the proinflammatory cytokine interferon, IFN-γ, were released in positive correlation with a greater severity of sleeping sickness. The influence of IFN-γ on the circadian timing system and the altered SCN function was observed.

Pro-inflammatory cytokines are released during an inflammatory response, generating reactions that alter the circadian clock. Cytokines such as TNF-alpha and IL-1 are associated with sleep sickness-related symptoms such as fever, fatigue, and sleep disturbances. The role of these cytokines is currently being explored; however, the sites of T. brucei infection generally involve an influx of inflammatory cells, which introduces its potential role in disrupting sleeping rhythms.

Trypanosoma brucei is an extracellular parasite that disrupts the host's circadian clock with its own intrinsic clock. T. brucei can regulate its metabolism at two different stages in vitro. The genes that function with a circadian rhythm in T. brucei exhibit maximum expression at two different stages in a day.

Instead of a traditional transcription and translation feedback loop model, T. brucei has its genome primarily organized into polycistronic units (PCUs) that are already transcribed mRNA molecules and has most of its gene expression regulated post-transcription, including cycling genes.

T. brucei has a circadian oscillating transcriptome that is most likely entrained to the tsetse daily biting pattern for the most effective parasitic transmission and triggers metabolic parasitic changes.

== Cause ==
The life cycle of the Trypanosoma brucei parasites

Trypanosoma brucei gambiense accounts for the majority of African trypanosomiasis cases, with humans as the primary reservoir for transmission. In contrast, Trypanosoma brucei rhodesiense is primarily zoonotic, with accidental human infections. The epidemiology of African trypanosomiasis is dependent on the interactions between the parasite (trypanosome), the vector (tsetse fly), and the host.

=== Risk factors ===
Risk factors include living in or traveling to rural areas of sub-Saharan Africa where tsetse flies are present. Occupations such as farming, fishing, and hunting increase exposure risk.

=== Trypanosoma brucei (T. brucei) ===
There are two subspecies of the parasite responsible for starting the disease in humans. Trypanosoma brucei gambiense causes the disease in West and Central Africa, whereas Trypanosoma brucei rhodesiense has a limited geographical range and is responsible for causing the disease in East and Southern Africa. In addition, a third subspecies of the parasite known as Trypanosoma brucei brucei is responsible for affecting animals but not humans.

Humans are the main reservoir for T. b. gambiense, but this species can also be found in pigs and other animals. Wild game animals and cattle are the main reservoir of T. b. rhodesiense. These parasites primarily infect individuals in sub-Saharan Africa because that is where the vector (tsetse fly) is located. The two human forms of the disease also vary greatly in intensity. T. b. gambiense causes a chronic condition that can remain in a passive stage for months or years before symptoms emerge, and the infection can last about three years before death occurs.

T. b. rhodesiense is the acute form of the disease, and death can occur within months since the symptoms emerge within weeks, and it is more virulent and faster developing than T. b. gambiense. Furthermore, trypanosomes are surrounded by a coat that is composed of variant surface glycoproteins (VSG). These proteins protect the parasite from any lytic factors that are present in human plasma. The host's immune system recognizes the glycoproteins present on the coat of the parasite, leading to the production of different antibodies (IgM and IgG).

These antibodies will then act to destroy the parasites that circulate in the blood. However, from the several parasites present in the plasma, a small number of them will experience changes in their surface coats, resulting in the formation of new VSGs. Thus, the antibodies produced by the immune system will no longer recognize the parasite, leading to proliferation until new antibodies are created to combat the novel VSGs. Eventually, the immune system will no longer be able to fight off the parasite due to the constant changes in VSGs, and infection will arise.

=== Vector ===
Type	Trypanosoma	Distribution	Vector
Chronic	T. brucei gambiense	Western Africa	G. palpalis G. tachinoides G. fuscipes G. morsitans
Acute	T. brucei rhodesiense	Eastern Africa	G. morsitans G. swynnertoni G. pallidipes G. fuscipes

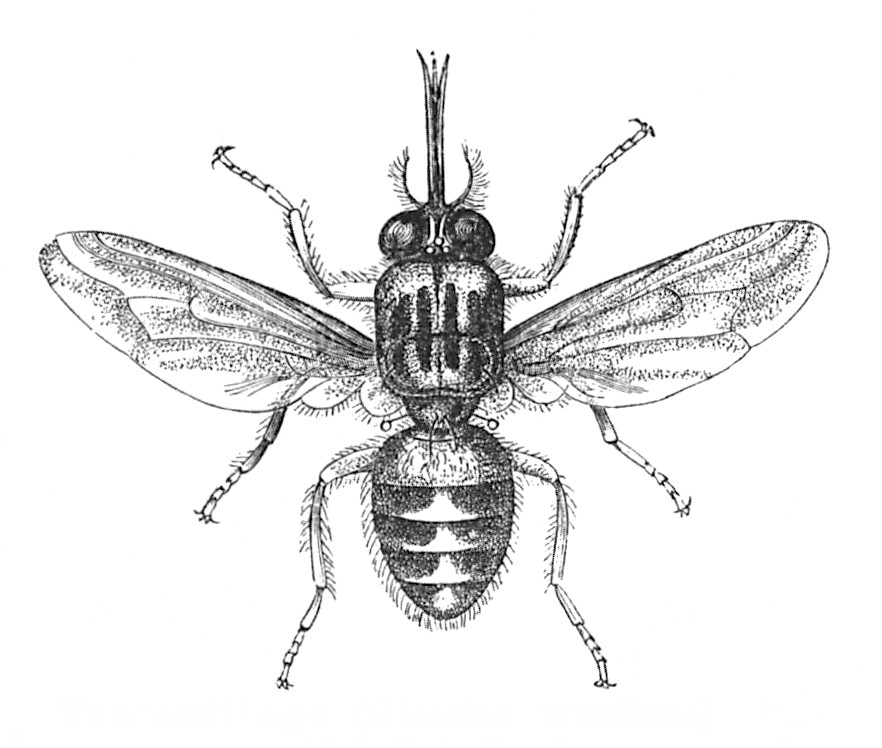
Drawing of a tsetse fly from 1890

The tsetse fly (genus Glossina) is a large, brown, biting fly that serves as both a host and vector for the trypanosome parasites. While taking blood from a mammalian host, an infected tsetse fly injects metacyclic trypomastigotes into the skin tissue. Metacyclic trypomastigotes are the infectious form of the parasite that develops in the salivary glands of the vector and is transmitted through the bite. From the bite, parasites first enter the lymphatic system and then pass into the bloodstream. Inside the mammalian host, they transform into bloodstream trypomastigotes and are carried to other sites throughout the body, reach other body fluids (e.g., lymph, spinal fluid), and continue to replicate by binary fission.

The entire life cycle of African trypanosomes is represented by extracellular stages. A tsetse fly becomes infected with bloodstream trypomastigotes when taking a blood meal on an infected mammalian host. The parasites then transform into procyclic trypomastigotes, specifically in the fly's midgut, multiply by binary fission, leave the midgut, and transform into epimastigotes. The epimastigotes reach the fly's salivary glands and continue multiplication by binary fission.

The entire life cycle of the fly takes about three weeks. In addition to the bite of the tsetse fly, the disease can be transmitted by:

- Mother-to-child infection: the trypanosome can sometimes cross the placenta and infect the fetus.
- Laboratories: accidental infections, for example, through the handling of blood of an infected person and organ transplantation, although this is uncommon.
- Blood transfusion
- Sexual contact

Horse-flies (Tabanidae) and stable flies (Muscidae) possibly play a role in the transmission of nagana (the animal form of sleeping sickness) and the human disease form. Studies have noted a strain of Tetste fly Glossina palpalis that has proved to pose a public health challenge in animal livestock because of a high carrier rate of DNA of trypanosome parasites. further studies can observe the carrier rate across a range of domestic animals in addition to determining the prevalence and risk factors of nagana in different seasons and establish seasonal variation in animal trypanosomiasis transmission.

=== Pathophysiology ===
Tryptophol is a chemical compound produced by the trypanosomal parasite in sleeping sickness, which induces sleep in humans.

== Diagnosis ==
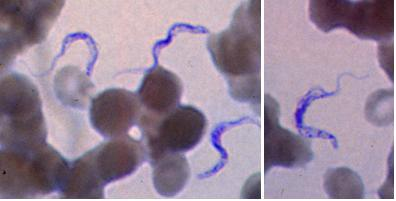
Two areas from a blood smear from a person with African trypanosomiasis, thin blood smear stained with Giemsa: typical trypomastigote stages (the only stages found in people), with a posterior kinetoplast, a centrally located nucleus, an undulating membrane, and an anterior flagellum. The two Trypanosoma brucei subspecies that cause human trypanosomiasis, T. b. gambiense and T. b. rhodesiense, are indistinguishable morphologically. The trypanosomes' length range is 14 to 33 μm; source: CDC.

The gold standard for diagnosis is the identification of trypanosomes in a sample by microscopic examination. Samples that can be used for diagnosis include ulcer fluid, lymph node aspirates, blood, bone marrow, and, during the neurological stage, cerebrospinal fluid. Detection of trypanosome-specific antibodies can aid diagnosis. The sensitivity and specificity of these methods are too variable to be used alone for clinical diagnosis. Further, seroconversion occurs after the onset of clinical symptoms during a T. b. rhodesiense infection, so is of limited diagnostic use.

Trypanosomes can be detected from samples using two different preparations. A wet preparation can be used to look for the motile trypanosomes. Alternatively, a fixed (dried) smear can be stained using Giemsa's or Field's technique and examined under a microscope. Often, the parasite is in relatively low abundance in the sample, so techniques to concentrate the parasites can be used before microscopic examination. For blood samples, these include centrifugation followed by an examination of the buffy coat; mini anion-exchange/centrifugation; and the quantitative buffy coat (QBC) technique. For other samples, such as spinal fluid, concentration techniques include centrifugation followed by an examination of the sediment.

Three serological tests are also available to detect the parasite: the micro-CATT (card agglutination test for trypanosomiasis), wb-CATT, and wb-LATEX. The first uses dried blood, while the other two use whole blood samples. A 2002 study found the wb-CATT to be the most efficient for diagnosis, while the wb-LATEX is a better exam for situations where greater sensitivity is required.

== Prevention ==
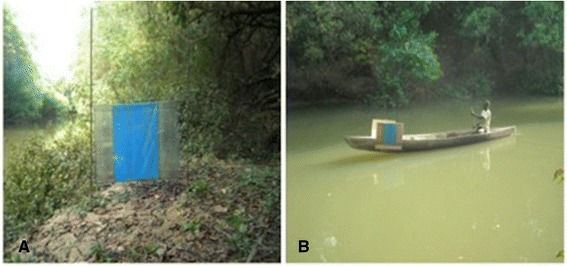
Capture devices for tsetse flies, on shore and on a boat in Africa. Efforts to prevent sleeping sickness.

Currently, there are few medically related prevention options for African trypanosomiasis; no vaccine exists for immunity. Although the risk of infection from a tsetse fly bite is minor (estimated at less than 0.1%), the use of insect repellants, wearing long-sleeved clothing, avoiding tsetse-dense areas, implementing bush clearance methods, and wild game culling are the best options to avoid infection available for residents of affected areas.

Regular active and passive surveillance, involving detection and prompt treatment of new infections, and tsetse fly control, are the backbone of the strategy used to control sleeping sickness. Systematic screening of at-risk communities is the best approach, because case-by-case screening is not practical in endemic regions. Systematic screening may be in the form of mobile clinics or fixed screening centers where teams travel daily to areas with high infection rates. Such screening efforts are important because early symptoms are not evident or serious enough to prompt people with gambiense disease to seek medical attention, particularly in very remote areas. Also, diagnosis of the disease is difficult, and health workers may not associate such general symptoms with trypanosomiasis. Systematic screening allows early-stage disease to be detected and treated before the disease progresses and removes the potential human reservoir. A single case of sexual transmission of West African sleeping sickness has been reported.

In July 2000, a resolution was passed to form the Pan African Tsetse and Trypanosomiasis Eradication Campaign (PATTEC). The campaign works to eradicate the tsetse vector population levels and subsequently the protozoan disease, by use of insecticide-impregnated targets, fly traps, insecticide-treated cattle, ultra-low dose aerial/ground spraying (SAT) of tsetse resting sites and the sterile insect technique (SIT). The use of SIT in Zanzibar proved effective in eliminating the entire population of tsetse flies but was expensive and is relatively impractical to use in many of the endemic countries afflicted with African trypanosomiasis.

A pilot program in Senegal has reduced the tsetse fly population by as much as 99% by introducing male flies that have been sterilized by exposure to gamma rays.

== Treatment ==
The treatment depends on whether the disease is discovered in the first or second stage. A requirement for treatment of the second stage is that the drug passes the blood–brain barrier.

=== First stage ===
The treatment for first-stage disease is fexinidazole by mouth or pentamidine by injection for T. b. gambiense. Suramin by injection was previously used for T. b. rhodesiense, but fexinidazole has replaced this as the first-line treatment since 2024.

=== Second stage ===
Fexinidazole may be used for the second stage of Trypanosoma brucei gambiense, if the disease is not severe. Otherwise a regimen involving the combination of nifurtimox and eflornithine, nifurtimox-eflornithine combination treatment, developed by the Drugs for Neglected Diseases initiative and partners, or eflornithine alone appear to be more effective and result in fewer side effects. These treatments may replace melarsoprol when available. The combination has the benefit of requiring fewer injections of eflornithine.

Intravenous melarsoprol was previously the standard treatment for second-stage (neurological stage) disease and is effective for both types. Melarsoprol, which causes death in 5% of people who take it and carries a risk of resistance development, was previously the only treatment for second stage T.b. rhodesiense. In 2024, it has been replaced by fexinidazole as the first-line treatment for sleeping sickness caused by T.b. rhodesiense.

==== Drug Development Projects ====
A major challenge has been to find drugs that readily pass the blood–brain barrier. The latest drug that has come into clinical use is fexinidazole. Promising results have also been obtained with the benzoxaborole drug acoziborole (SCYX-7158), developed by the Drugs for Neglected Diseases initiative. The European Medicines Agency adopted a positive scientific opinion on this drug single-dose oral treatment in February 2026, paving the way for registration and distribution in endemic countries. The Democratic Republic of the Congo approved acoziborole in June 2026 for use in its national sleeping sickness control programme, becoming the first country to authorize the drug. Another research field that has been extensively studied in Trypanosoma brucei is to target its nucleotide metabolism. The nucleotide metabolism studies have both led to the development of adenosine analogues looking promising in animal studies, and to the finding that downregulation of the P2 adenosine transporter is a common way to acquire partial drug resistance against the melaminophenyl arsenical and diamidine drug families (containing melarsoprol and pentamidine, respectively). Drug uptake and degradation are two major issues to consider to avoid drug resistance development. In the case of nucleoside analogues, they need to be taken up by the P1 nucleoside transporter (instead of P2), and they also need to be resistant to cleavage in the parasite.

== Prognosis ==
If untreated, T. b. gambiense almost always results in death, with only a few individuals shown in a long-term 15-year follow-up to have survived after refusing treatment. T. b. rhodesiense, being a more acute and severe form of the disease, is consistently fatal if not treated.

Disease progression varies greatly depending on disease form. For individuals who are infected by T. b. gambiense, which accounts for 92% of all of the reported cases, a person can be infected for months or even years without signs or symptoms until the advanced disease stage, where it is too late to be treated successfully. For individuals affected by T. b. rhodesiense, which accounts for 2% of all reported cases, symptoms appear within weeks or months of the infection. Disease progression is rapid and invades the central nervous system, causing death within a short amount of time.

== Epidemiology ==
In 2010, it caused around 9,000 deaths, down from 34,000 in 1990. As of 2000, the disability-adjusted life-years (9 to 10 years) lost due to sleeping sickness are 2.0 million. From 2010 to 2014, there was an estimated 55 million people at risk for gambiense African Trypanosomiasis and over 6 million people at risk for rhodesiense African trypanosomiasis. In 2014, the World Health Organization reported 3,797 cases of Human African Trypanosomiasis when the predicted number of cases was to be 5,000. The number of total reported cases in 2014 is an 86% reduction from the total number of cases reported in 2000.

The disease has been recorded in 37 countries, all in sub-Saharan Africa. The Democratic Republic of the Congo is the most affected country in the world, accounting for 75% of the Trypanosoma brucei gambiense cases. In 2009, the population at risk was estimated at 69 million, with one-third of this number being at a 'very high' to 'moderate' risk and the remaining two-thirds at a 'low' to 'very low' risk. Since then, the number of people being affected by the disease has continued to decline, with fewer than 1000 cases per year reported from 2018 onwards. Against this backdrop, sleeping sickness elimination is considered a real possibility, with the World Health Organization targeting the elimination of the transmission of the gambiese form by 2030. New treatments, such as single-dose acoziborole, will be critical for elimination.

As with other infectious diseases, climate change will have an effect on the distribution and the risk of transmission of African trypanosomiasis. However, it depends on the geographical region, disease-carrying species, the exact climate change scenario, and many other factors whether there will be a decrease or increase in the disease.

Reported cases of acute african trypanosomiasis

Reported cases of chronic african trypanosomiasis

Trypanosoma brucei gambiense	1990	1991	1992	1993	1994	1995	1996	1997	1998	1999	2000	2001	2002	2003	2004	2005	2006	2007	2008	2009	2010	2011	2012	2013	2014	2015	2016	2017	2018	2019	2020	2021	2022	2023	2024	2025
Angola	1498	2094	2406	1796	1274	2441	6726	8275	6610	5351	4546	4577	3621	3115	2280	1727	1105	648	517	247	211	154	70	69	36	35	19	18	79	30	33	174	44	52	10	5
Benin	0	0	2	1	0	0	0	0	0	20	0	0	0	0	0	0	0	0	0	0	0	0	0	0	0	0	0	0	0	0	0	0	0	0	0	0
Burkina Faso	27	27	20	17	18	13	12	1	15	15	0	0	0	0	0	0	0	0	0	0	0	0	0	0	0	1	0	0	0	0	0	0	0	0	0	0
Cameroon	86	69	21	3	20	21	17	10	54	32	27	14	32	33	17	3	15	7	13	24	16	15	7	6	7	6	6	5	7	17	2	11	7	11	5	2
Central African Republic	308	197	362	262	368	676	492	730	1068	869	988	718	572	539	738	666	460	654	1194	1054	395	132	381	59	194	147	124	76	57	86	39	44	110	104	111	86
Chad	20	221	149	65	214	315	178	122	134	187	153	138	715	222	483	190	276	97	196	510	232	276	197	195	95	67	53	28	12	16	17	15	18	7	5	5
Congo	580	703	727	829	418	475	474	142	201	91	111	894	1005	717	873	398	300	189	182	87	87	61	39	20	21	36	18	15	24	17	15	18	10	14	26	35
Côte d'Ivoire	365	349	456	260	206	326	240	185	121	104	188	92	97	68	74	42	29	13	14	8	8	10	9	7	6	3	0	3	2	1	0	1	0	0	0	0
Democratic Republic of the Congo	7515	5825	7757	11384	19021	18182	19342	25094	26318	18684	16951	17300	13816	11459	10339	10249	8013	8155	7318	7178	5624	5590	5968	5647	3205	2351	1769	1110	660	604	395	425	516	394	330	245
Equatorial Guinea	63	36	45	30	85	37	46	67	62	28	16	17	32	23	22	17	13	15	11	7	8	1	2	3	0	0	3	4	4	3	1	3	13	7	12	4
Gabon	80	45	33	80	61	20	32	11	6	38	45	30	26	26	49	53	31	30	24	14	22	17	9	17	10	9	10	9	16	8	11	18	21	12	8	8
Ghana	3	6	16	0	0	0	1	0	0	0	1	0	0	0	0	0	0	0	0	0	0	0	0	1	0	0	0	0	0	0	0	0	0	0	0	0
Guinea	52	29	24	27	26	33	38	88	99	68	52	72	132	130	95	94	48	69	90	79	68	57	70	78	33	29	107	140	74	69	36	28	30	24	12	21
Mali	0	0	0	27	17	11	0	0	0	0	0	0	0	0	0	0	0	0	0	0	0	0	0	0	0	0	0	0	0	0	0	0	0	0	0	0
Nigeria	24	0	0	0	0	0	0	0	0	27	14	14	26	31	10	21	3	0	0	0	2	3	2	0	0	0	1	0	0	0	0	0	0	0	0	0
South Sudan	67	58	28	62	69	56	157	737	1726	1312	1801	1919	3121	3061	1742	1853	789	469	623	373	199	272	317	117	63	45	17	12	17	11	15	10	30	50	27	19
Togo	2	0	0	0	0	3	0	0	0	0	0	0	0	0	0	0	0	0	0	0	0	0	0	0	0	0	0	0	0	0	0	0	0	0	0	0
Uganda	2066	1328	2042	1764	1469	1062	981	1123	971	1036	948	310	604	517	378	311	290	120	198	99	101	44	20	9	9	4	4	0	1	2	1	0	0	0	0	0
Total	12756	10987	14088	16607	23266	23671	28736	36585	37385	27862	25841	26095	23799	19941	17100	15624	11372	10466	10380	9680	6973	6632	7091	6228	3679	2733	2131	1420	953	864	565	747	799	675	546	430
Trypanosoma brucei rhodesiense	1990	1991	1992	1993	1994	1995	1996	1997	1998	1999	2000	2001	2002	2003	2004	2005	2006	2007	2008	2009	2010	2011	2012	2013	2014	2015	2016	2017	2018	2019	2020	2021	2022	2023	2024	2025
Ethiopia	No data	No data	No data	No data	No data	No data	No data	No data	No data	No data	No data	No data	No data	No data	No data	No data	No data	No data	No data	No data	No data	No data	No data	No data	No data	No data	No data	No data	No data	No data	No data	No data	6	2	0	0
Kenya	91	8	4	2	1	0	2	5	14	22	15	10	11	0	0	0	1	0	0	1	0	0	2	0	0	0	0	0	0	0	0	0	0	0	0	0
Malawi	228	195	143	53	31	15	8	7	10	11	35	38	43	70	48	41	58	50	49	39	29	23	18	35	32	30	37	7	15	91	89	49	24	16	13	12
Mozambique	3	7	24	10	16	No data	No data	No data	No data	No data	No data	No data	1	No data	1	No data	No data	No data	No data	No data	No data	No data	No data	No data	No data	No data	No data	No data	No data	No data	No data	No data	No data	No data	No data	0
Uganda	1417	832	606	503	342	497	178	217	283	283	300	426	329	338	335	473	261	119	138	129	112	84	71	43	70	28	10	13	4	5	2	2	0	0	3	1
United Republic of Tanzania	187	177	366	262	319	422	400	354	299	288	350	277	228	113	159	186	127	126	59	14	5	1	4	1	1	2	3	3	0	3	1	1	1	1	0	0
Zambia	7	No data	4	1	1	1	3	No data	No data	15	9	4	5	15	9	7	6	10	13	4	8	3	6	6	12	8	2	3	5	15	6	3	7	5	18	25
Zimbabwe	No data	No data	No data	No data	1	No data	No data	9	No data	No data	No data	No data	No data	No data	No data	3	No data	No data	0	3	2	4	9	1	3	3	1	1	0	2	0	0	0	0	3	3
Total	1933	1219	1147	831	710	935	591	583	606	619	709	755	617	536	552	707	453	305	259	187	154	111	101	85	115	68	52	27	24	116	98	55	38	24	37	41

== History ==
African trypanosomes can be traced back to prehistoric times. After analyzing and reconstructing the genes that encode for small subunit ribosomal RNA, researchers find that Salivarian trypanosomes, which include African trypanosomes, separated from other trypanosomes approximately 300 million years ago. Eventually, the African trypanosomes became parasites found in the digestive system, likely a precursor for early insects. Since tsetse flies emerged about 35 million years ago, the transmission of trypanosomes to mammals has occurred. This immense period of exposure to trypanosomes may serve as the reason for most African wildlife species being tolerant of trypanosomiasis with no symptoms. In addition to wild life, African trypanosomes have affected human evolution in sub-Saharan regions of Africa. Humans have evolved to be resistant to all other African Trypanosome species except T. b. Gambiense and T. b. Rhodesiense.

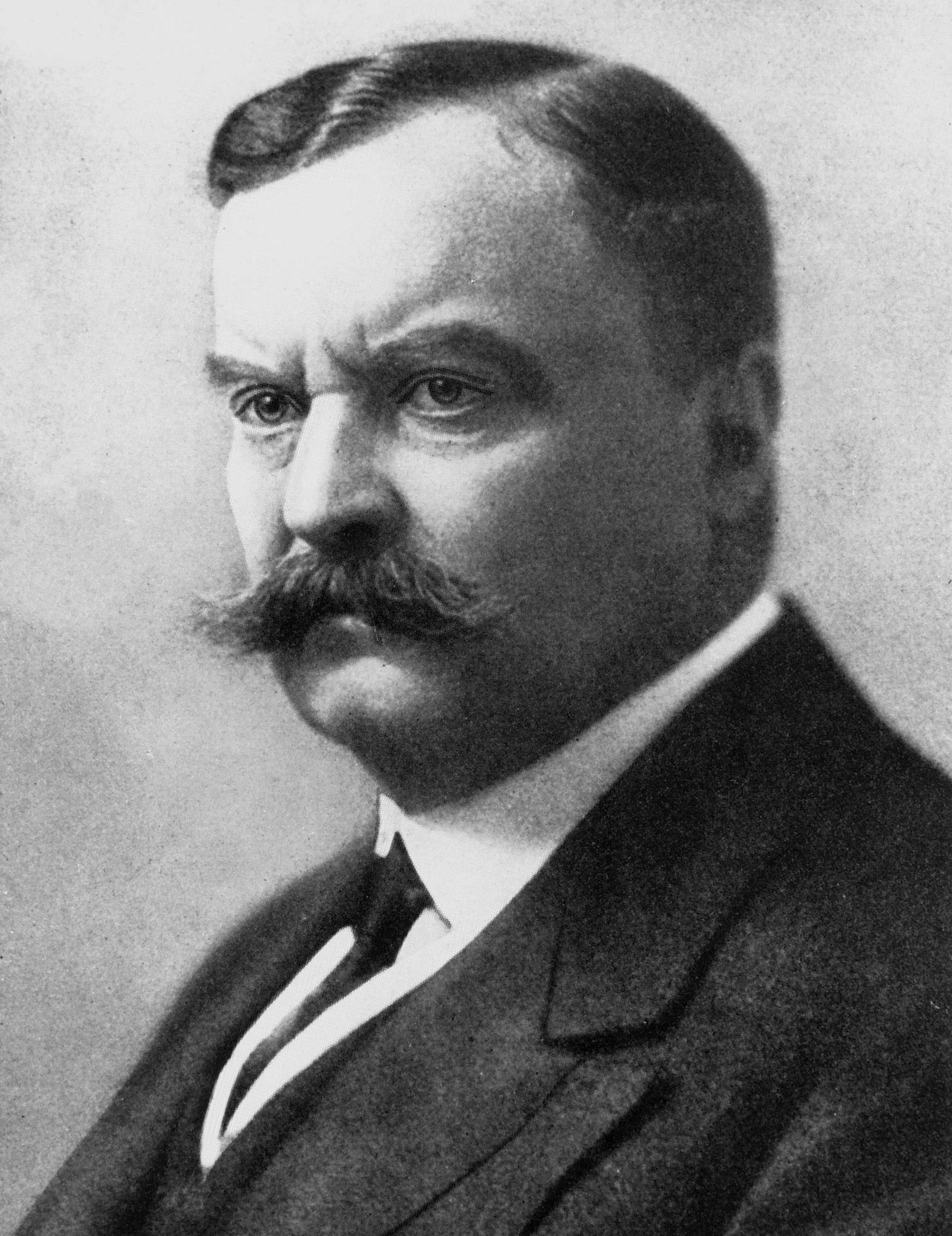
In 1903, David Bruce recognized the tsetse fly as the arthropod vector.

The condition has been present in Africa for millions of years. In contrast to arboreal primates, who are susceptible to trypanosomiasis, humans, with the exception of T. b. gambiense and T. b. rhodesiense infections, are resistant to the parasite. This serves as a marker in the evolutionary divergence of early hominid natural selection. Because of a lack of travel between Indigenous people, sleeping sickness in humans had been limited to isolated pockets. Due to the increasing number of deaths caused by the disease, the first accounts of African sleeping sickness came from doctors on slave ships who were implored by slave traders to investigate this disease. Arab slave traders entered central Africa from the east, following the Congo River, bringing parasites along. Gambian sleeping sickness travelled up the Congo River, and then further east.

An Arab writer of the 14th century left the following description in the case of a sultan of the Mali Kingdom: "His end was to be overtaken by the sleeping sickness (illat an-nawm), which is a disease that frequently befalls the inhabitants of these countries, especially their chieftains. Sleep overtakes one of them in such a manner that it is hardly possible to awake him."

The British naval surgeon John Atkins described the disease on his return from West Africa in 1734:

The Sleepy Distemper (common among the Negroes) gives no other previous Notice, than a want of Appetite 2 or 3 days before; their sleeps are sound, and Sense and Feeling very little; for pulling, drubbing or whipping will scarce stir up Sense and Power enough to move; and the Moment you cease beating the smart is forgot, and down they fall again into a state of Insensibility, drivling constantly from the Mouth as in deep salivation; breathe slowly, but not unequally nor snort. Young people are more subject to it than the old; and the Judgement generally pronounced is Death, the Prognostik seldom failing. If now and then one of them recovers, he certainly loses the little Reason he had, and turns Ideot...

French naval surgeon Marie-Théophile Griffon du Bellay treated and described cases while stationed aboard the hospital ship Caravane in Gabon in the late 1860s.

In 1901, a devastating epidemic erupted in Uganda, killing more than 250,000 people, including about two-thirds of the population in the affected lakeshore areas. According to The Cambridge History of Africa, "It has been estimated that up to half the people died of sleeping sickness and smallpox in the lands on either bank of the lower river Congo."

The causative agent and vector were identified in 1903 by David Bruce, and the subspecies of the protozoa were differentiated in 1910. Bruce had earlier shown that T. brucei was the cause of a similar disease in horses and cattle that was transmitted by the tsetse fly (Glossina morsitans).

The first effective treatment, atoxyl, an arsenic-based drug developed by Paul Ehrlich and Kiyoshi Shiga, was introduced in 1910, but blindness was a serious side effect.

Suramin was first synthesized by Oskar Dressel and Richard Kothe in 1916 for Bayer. It was introduced in 1920 to treat the first stage of the disease. By 1922, Suramin was generally combined with tryparsamide (another pentavalent organoarsenic drug), the first drug to enter the nervous system and be useful in the treatment of the second stage of the gambiense form. Tryparsamide was announced in the Journal of Experimental Medicine in 1919 and tested in the Belgian Congo by Louise Pearce of the Rockefeller Institute in 1920. It was used during the grand epidemic in West and Central Africa on millions of people and was the mainstay of therapy until the 1960s. American medical missionary Arthur Lewis Piper was active in using tryparsamide to treat sleeping sickness in the Belgian Congo in 1925.

Pentamidine, a highly effective drug for the first stage of the disease, has been used since 1937. During the 1950s, it was widely used as a prophylactic agent in western Africa, leading to a sharp decline in infection rates. At the time, eradication of the disease was thought to be at hand.

The organoarsenical melarsoprol (Arsobal) developed in the 1940s is effective for people with second-stage sleeping sickness. However, 3–10% of those injected have reactive encephalopathy (convulsions, progressive coma, or psychotic reactions), and 10–70% of such cases result in death; it can cause brain damage in those who survive the encephalopathy. However, due to its effectiveness, melarsoprol is still used today. Resistance to melarsoprol is increasing, and combination therapy with nifurtimox is currently under research.

Eflornithine (difluoromethylornithine or DFMO), the most modern treatment, was developed in the 1970s by Albert Sjoerdsma and underwent clinical trials in the 1980s. The drug was approved by the United States Food and Drug Administration in 1990. Aventis, the company responsible for its manufacture, halted production in 1999. In 2001, Aventis, in association with the World Health Organization, signed a five-year agreement to manufacture and donate the drug.

In addition to sleeping sickness, previous names have included negro lethargy, maladie du sommeil (Fr), Schlafkrankheit (Ger), African lethargy, and Congo trypanosomiasis.

The British-led Sleeping Sickness Commission collecting tsetse flies, Uganda and Nyasaland, 1908–1913

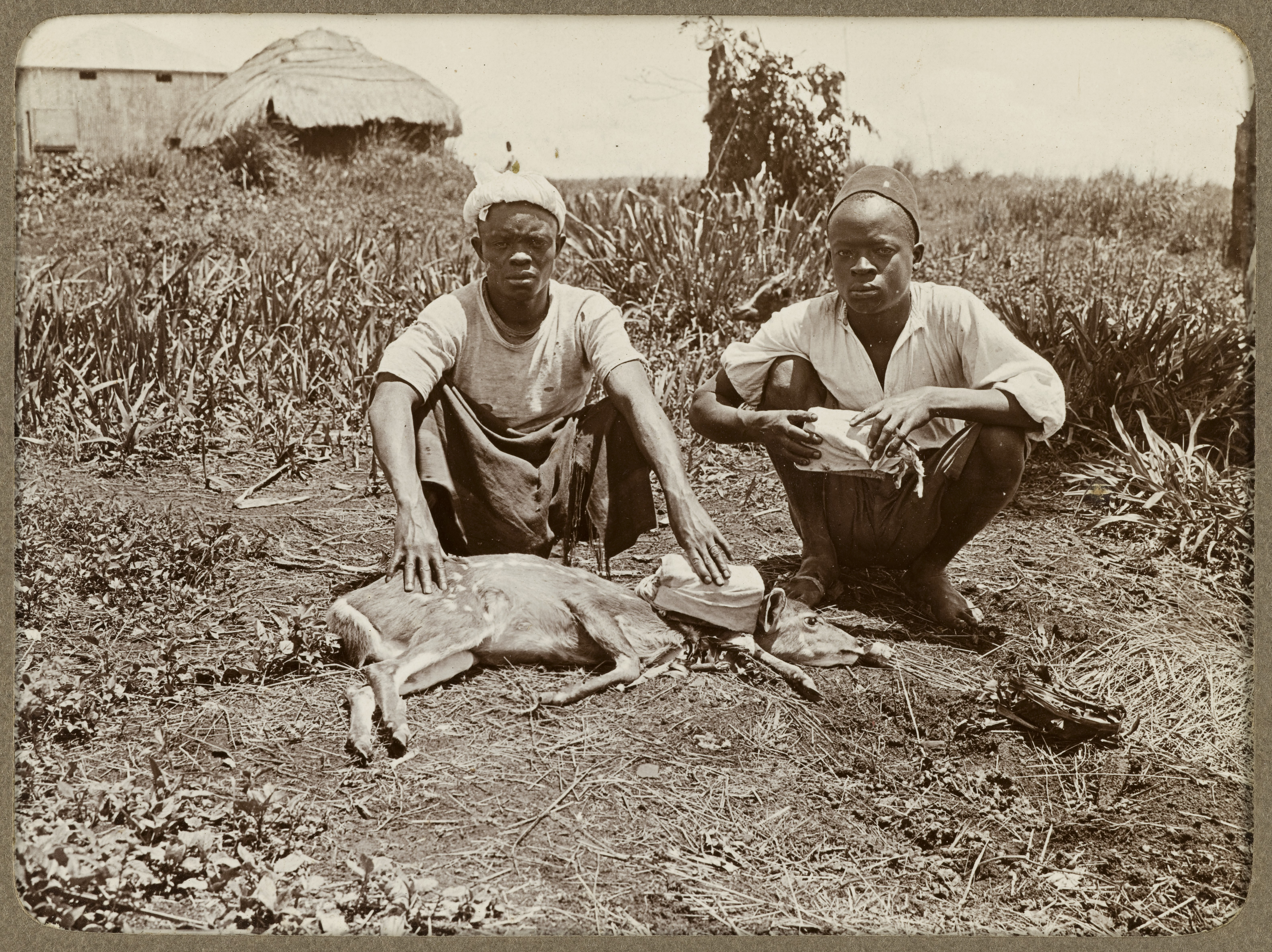

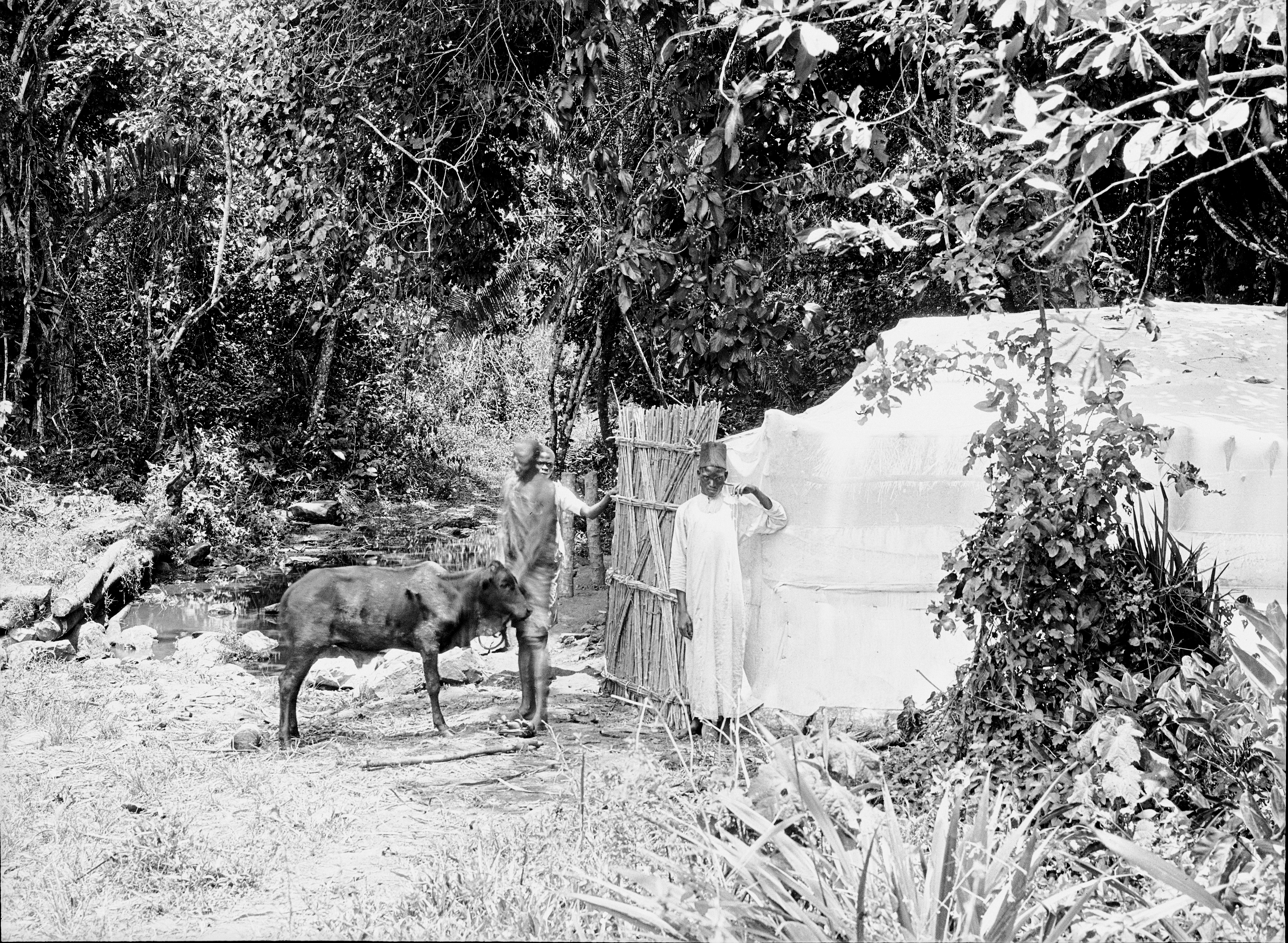

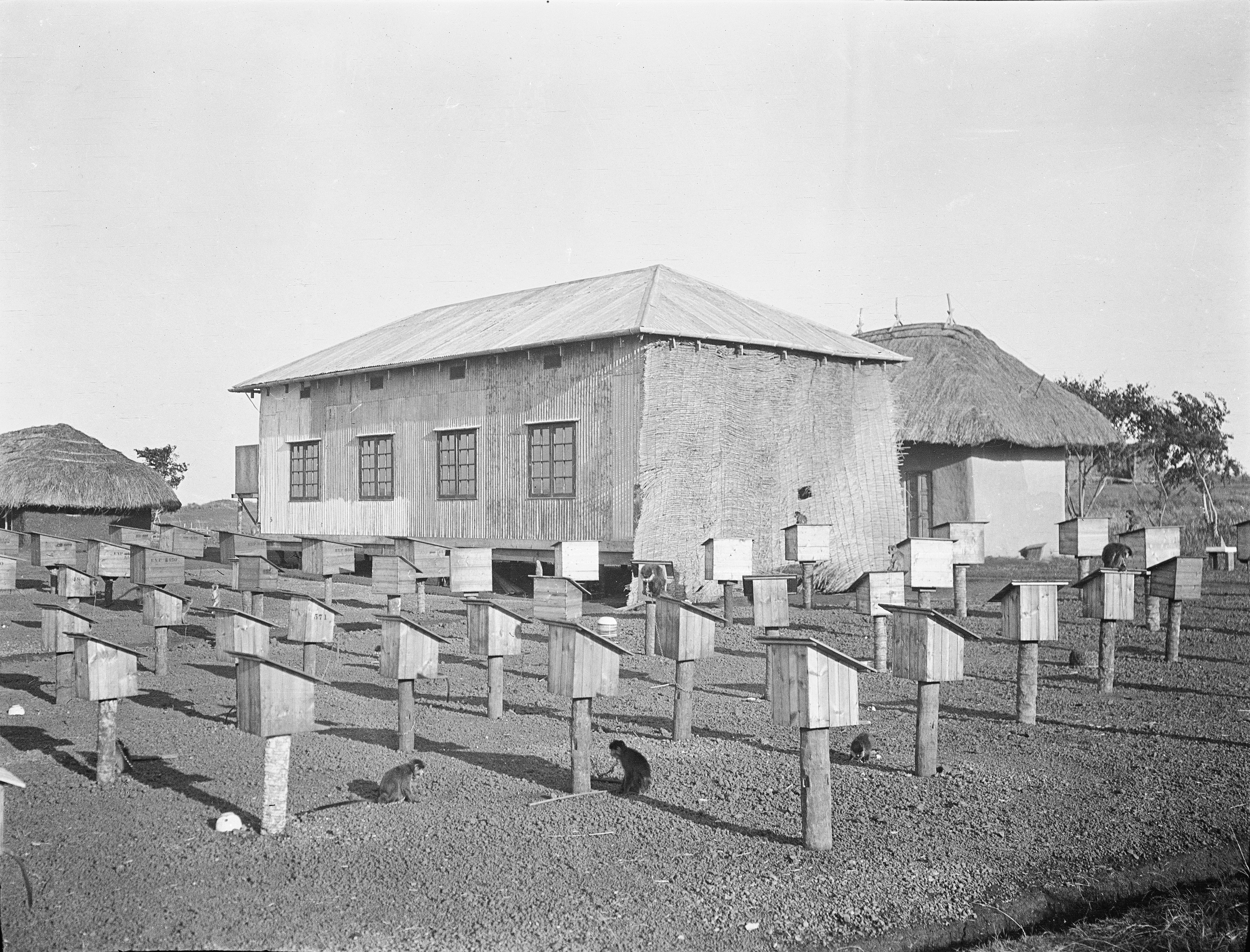

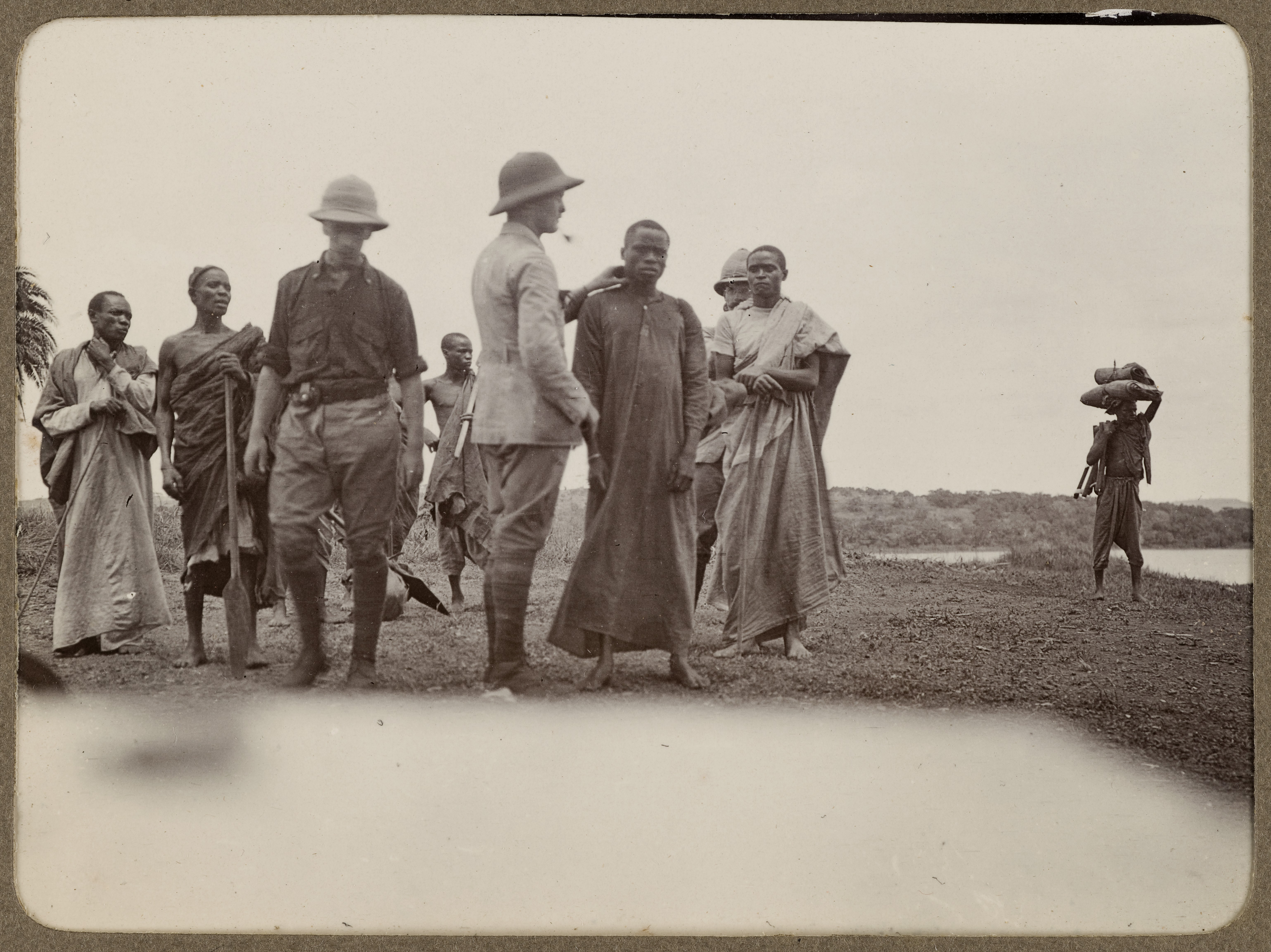

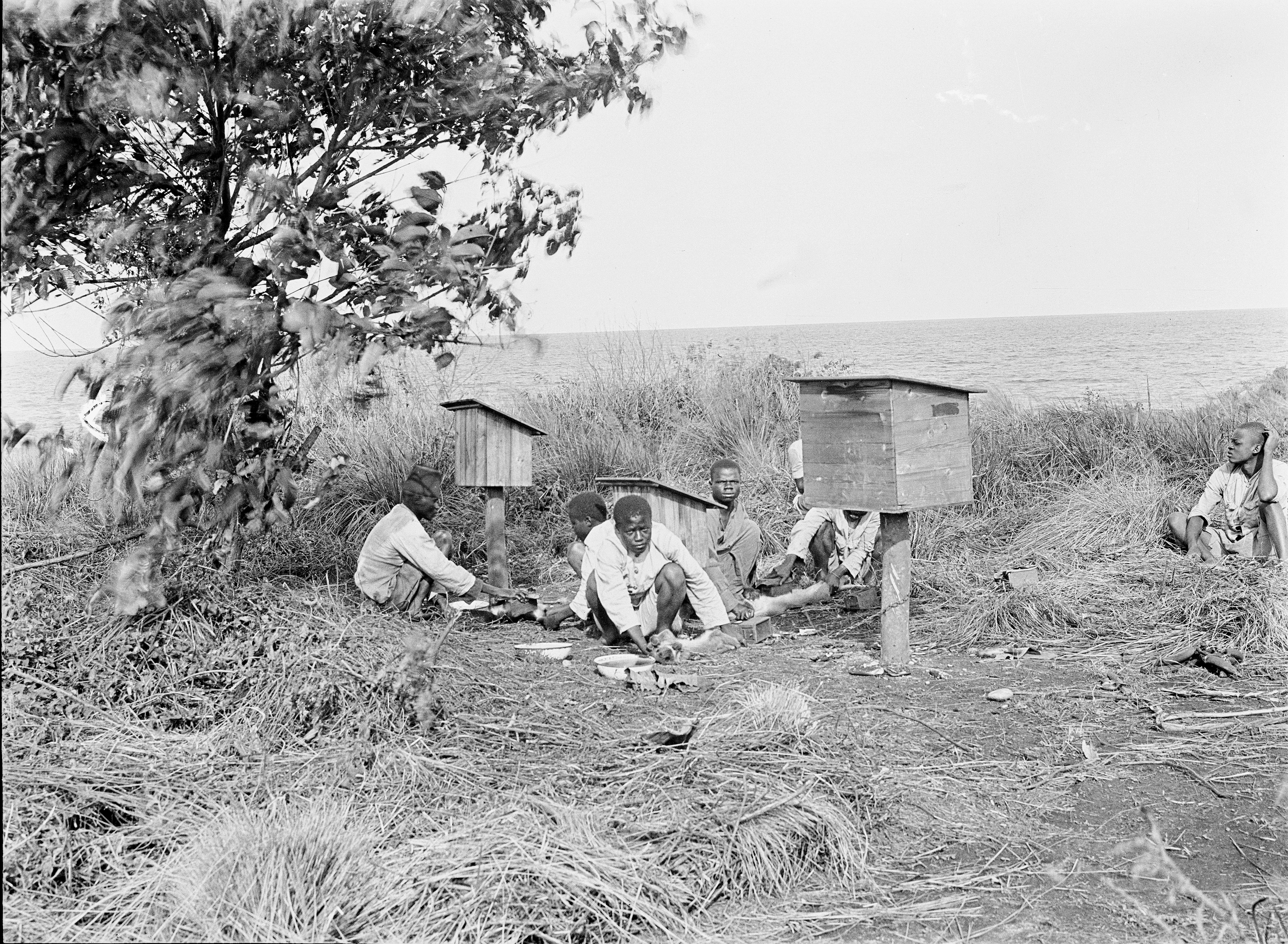

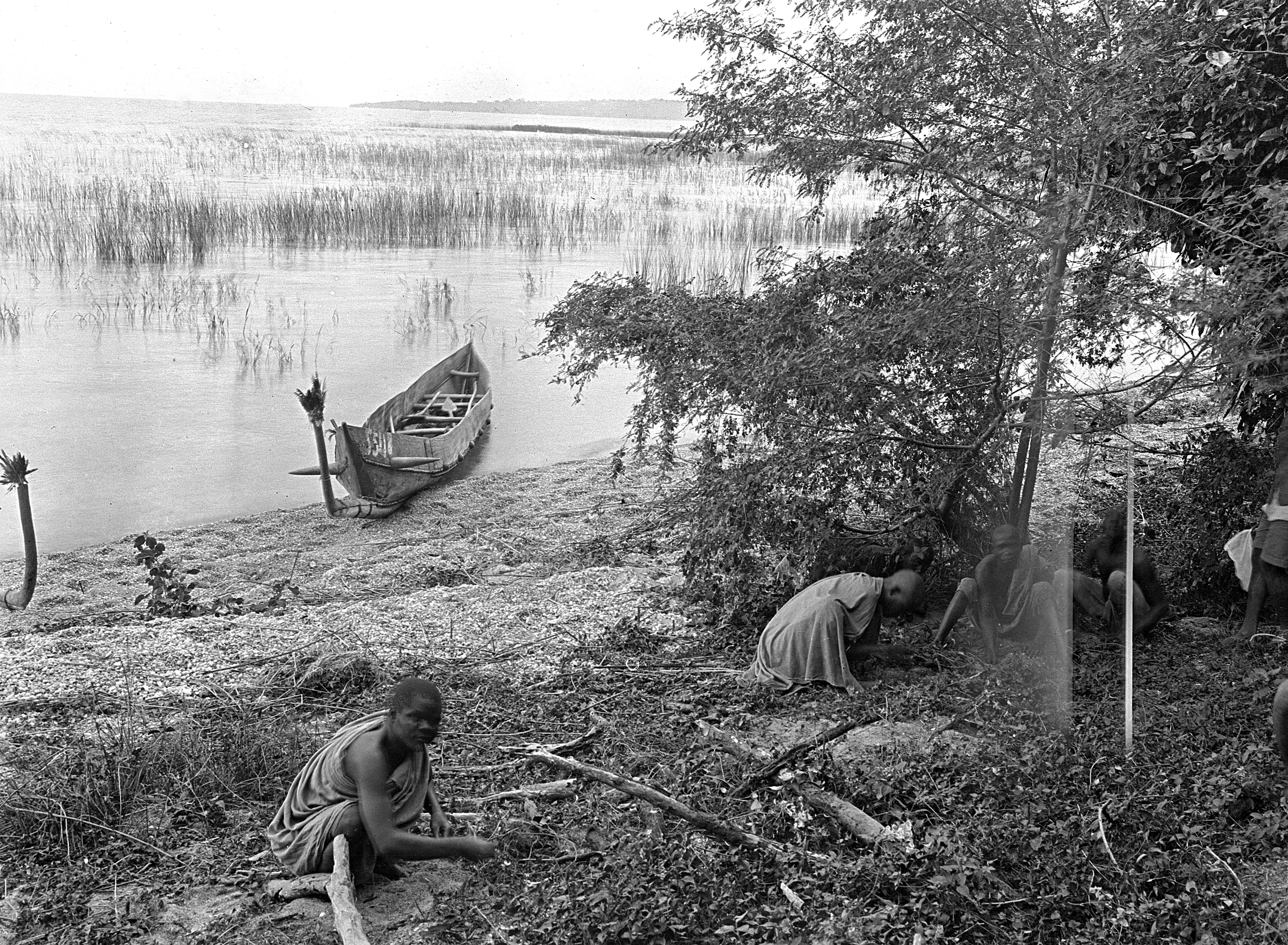

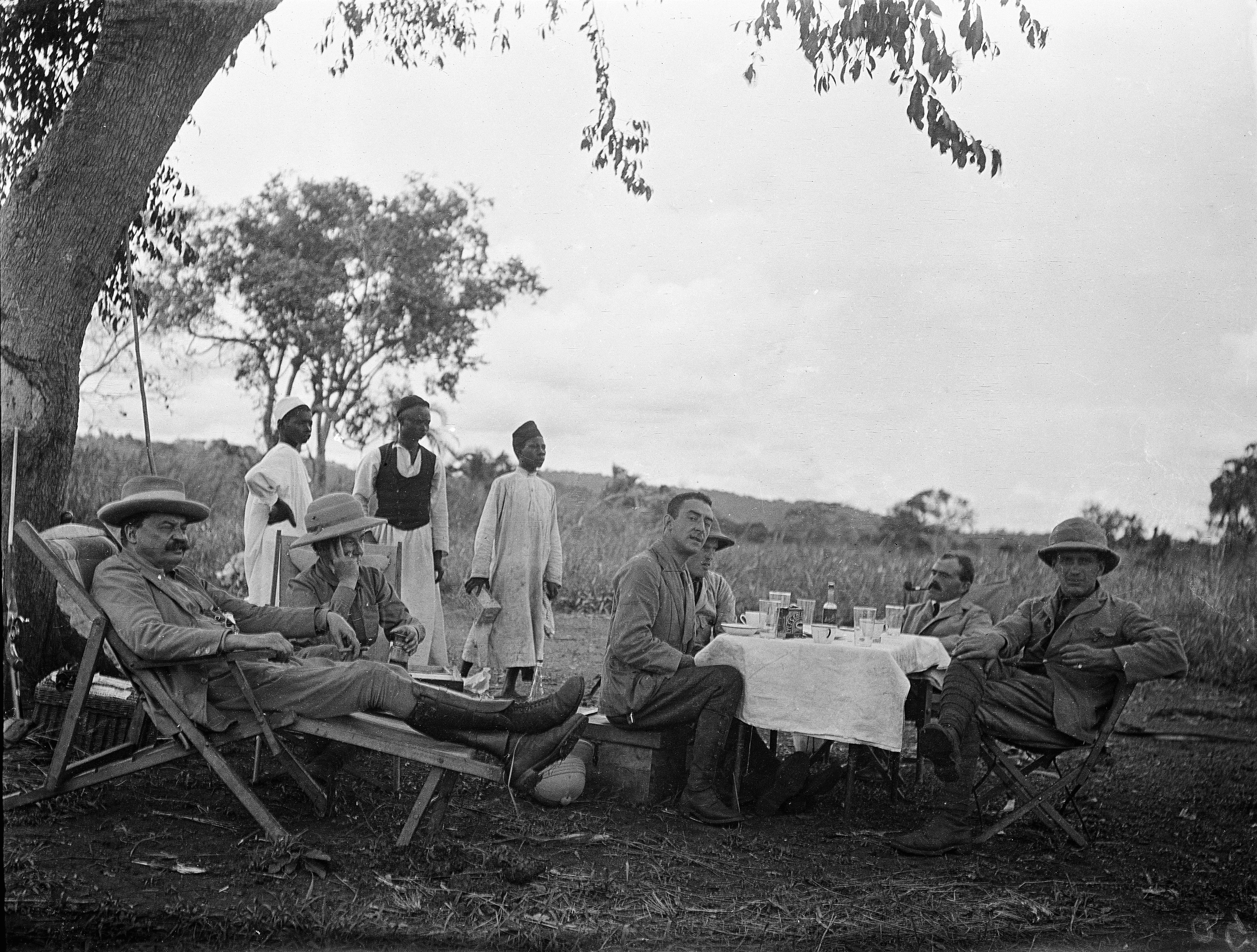

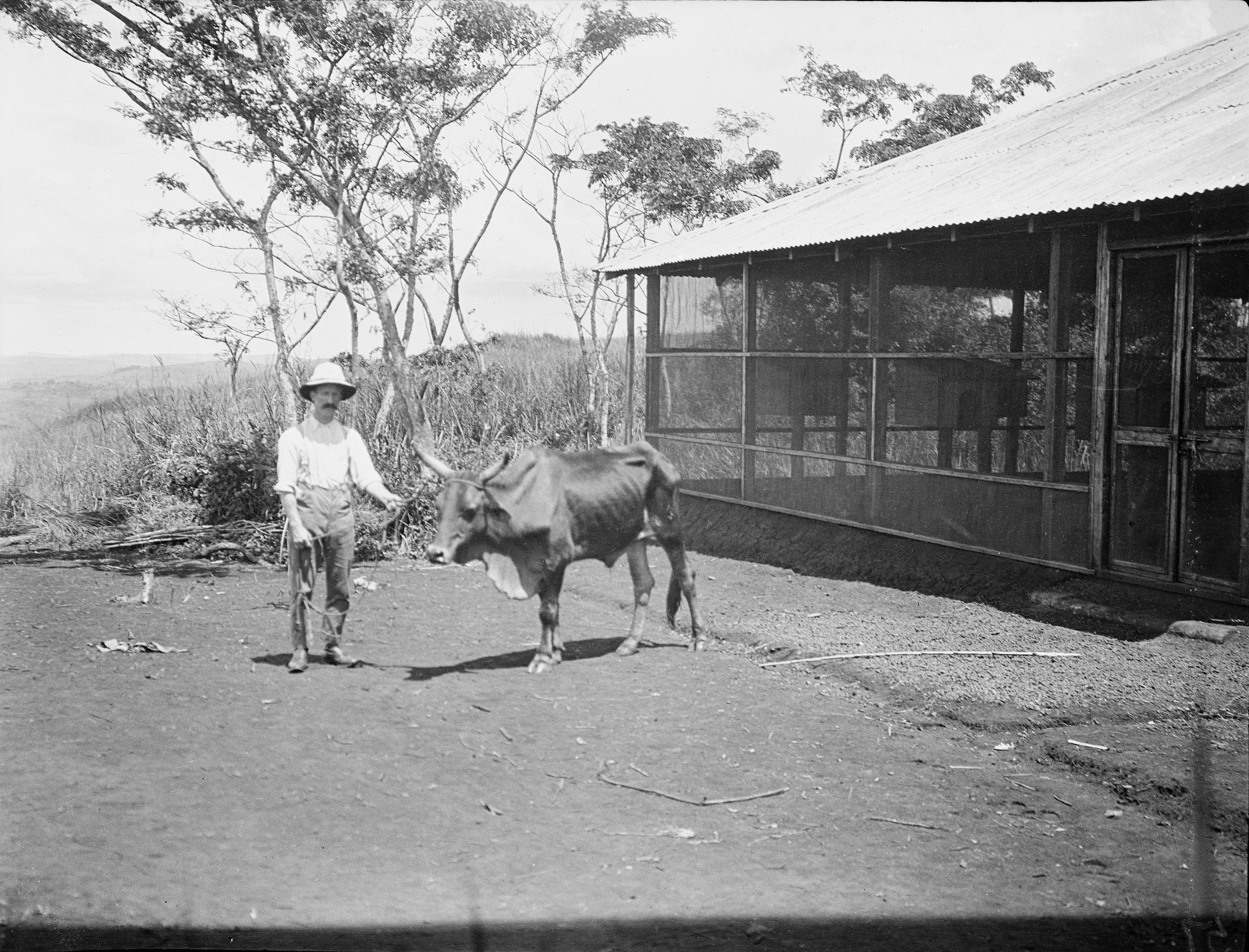

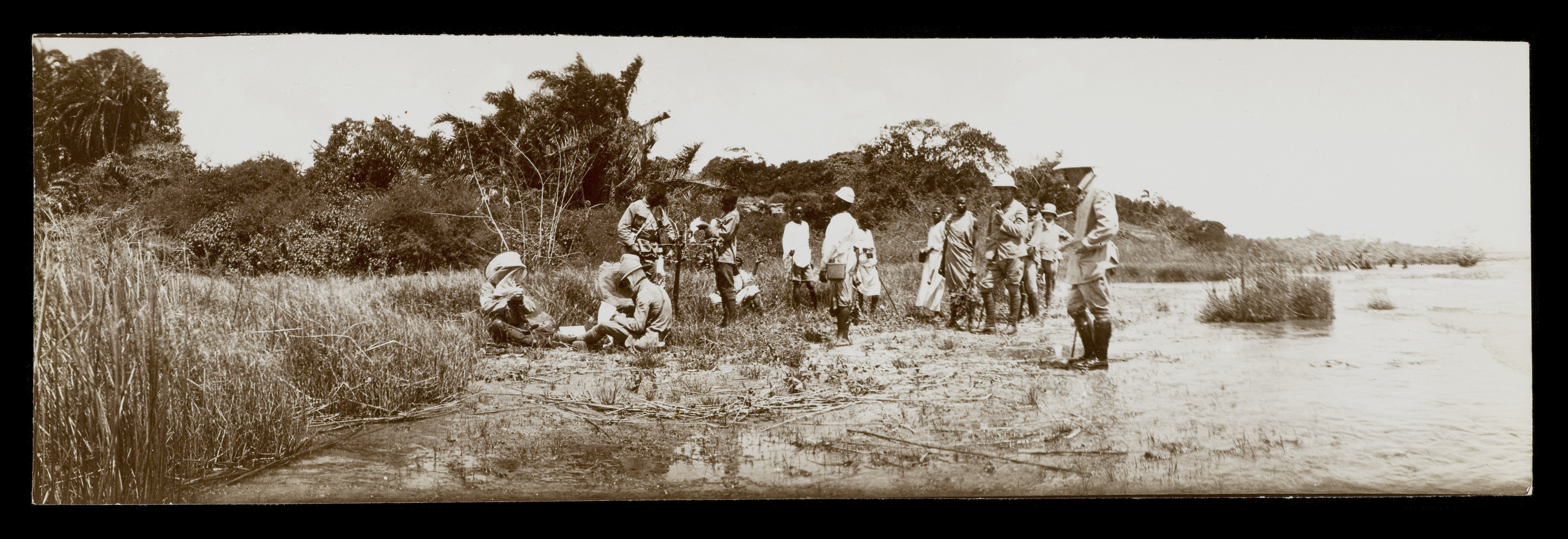

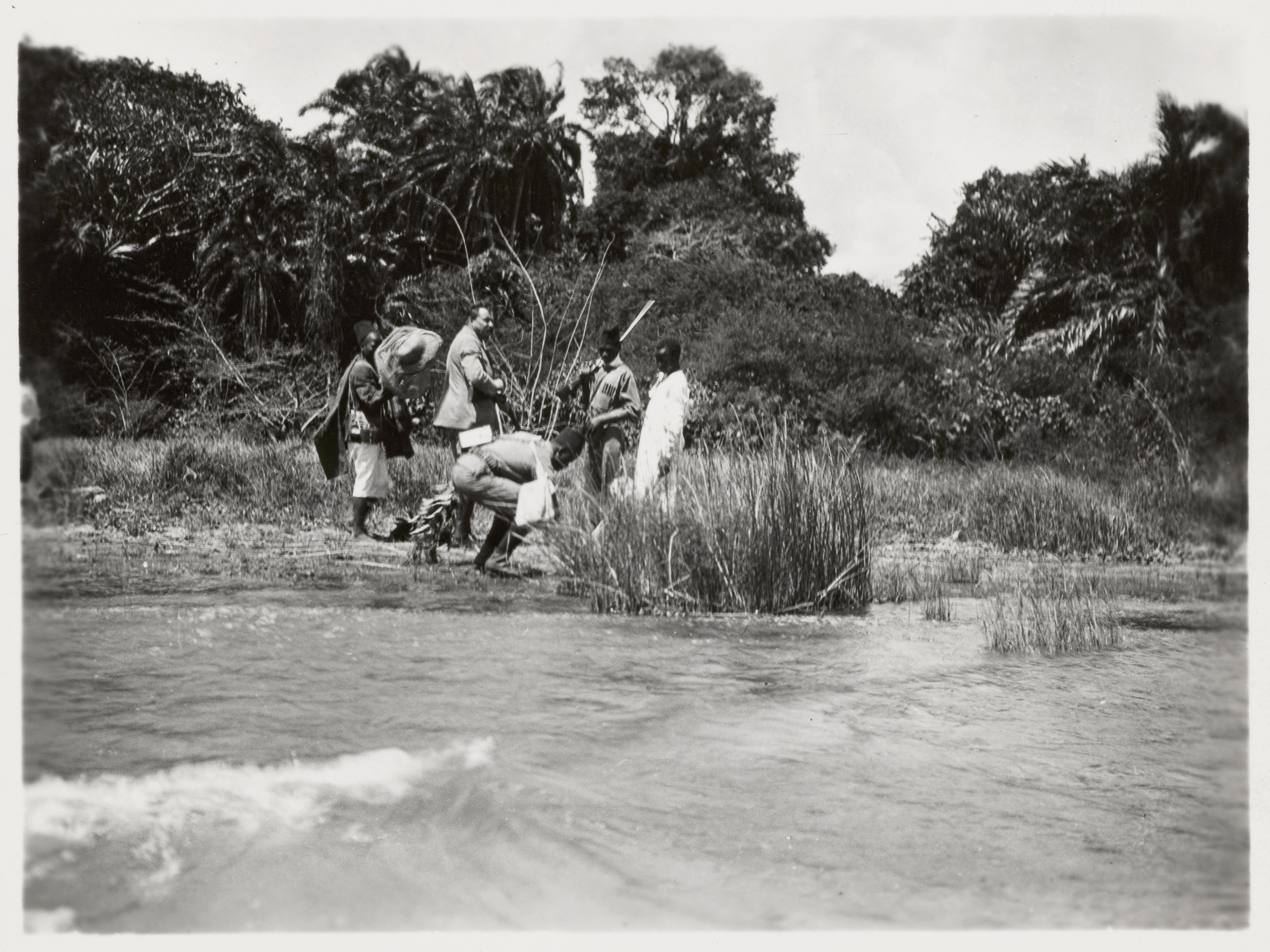

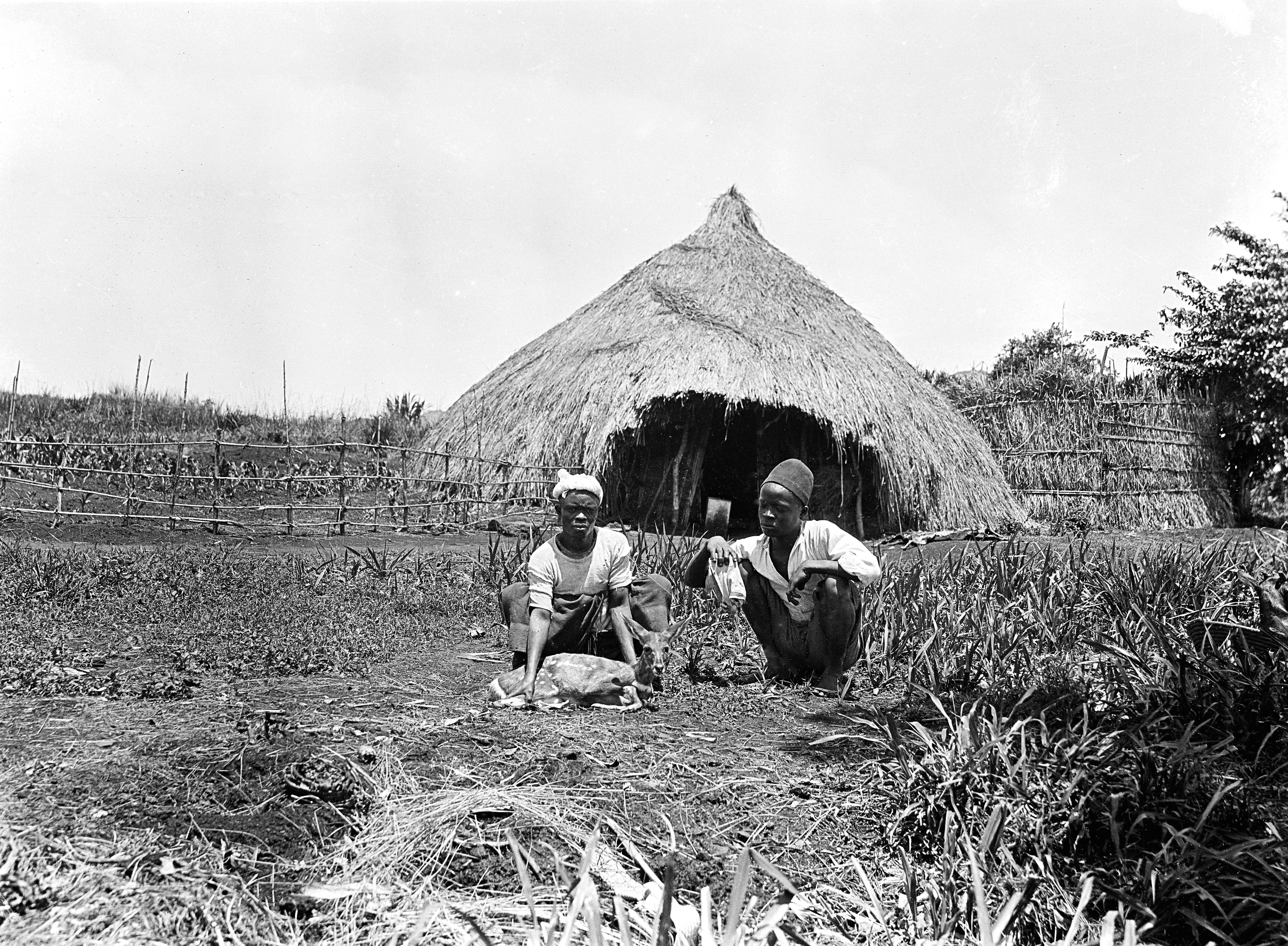

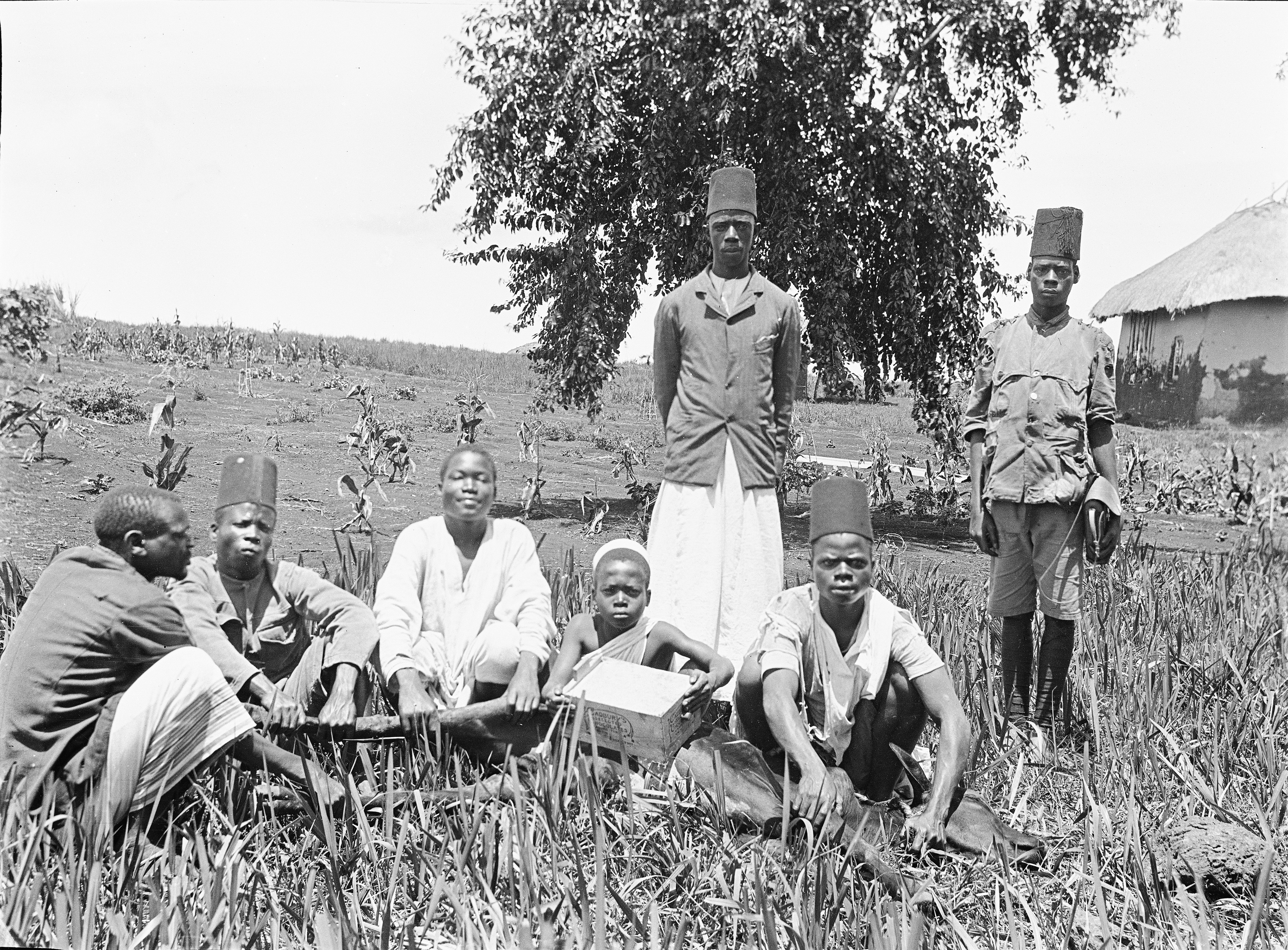

== Research ==
The genome of the parasite has been sequenced and several proteins have been identified as potential targets for drug treatment. Analysis of the genome also revealed the reason why generating a vaccine for this disease has been so difficult. T. brucei has over 800 genes and employs a mechanism of genetic variation, frequently changing its surface proteins to evade detection by the host's immune system.

Using a genetically modified form of a bacterium that occurs naturally in the gut of the vectors is being studied as a method of controlling the disease.

Recent findings indicate that the parasite cannot survive in the bloodstream without its flagellum, a crucial appendage for movement and survival. This insight gives researchers a new angle with which to attack the parasite.

Trypanosomiasis vaccines are undergoing research.

The nifurtimox/eflornithine combination treatment was developed by Drugs for Neglected Diseases initiative and partners. The results of a 2009 pivotal clinical trial sponsored by Drugs for Neglected Diseases initiative and Médecins Sans Frontières (MSF) showing that this combination treatment was a safe and effective treatment for sleeping sickness were confirmed in a larger trial conducted in field conditions between 2009 and 2012.

Additionally, the Drugs for Neglected Diseases Initiative has contributed to the African sleeping sickness research by developing a compound called fexinidazole. This project was originally started in April 2007 and enrolled 749 people in the DRC and Central African Republic. The results showed efficacy and safety in both stages of the disease, both in adults and children ≥ 6 years old and weighing ≥ 20 kg. The European Medicines Agency approved it for first and second stage disease outside of Europe in November 2018. The treatment was approved in the DRC in December 2018. In August 2024, the World Health Organization recommended fexinidazole to replace suramin and melarsoprol as the first-line treatment for sleeping sickness caused by T.b. rhodesiense.

=== Clock gene ===
Studies using transgenic rat models infected with Trypanosoma Brucei and maintained in a 12:12 LD cycle showed no significant effect on oscillations of Per1-luciferase expression or in real-time qPCR, in SCN tissue, significant alterations to circadian rhythms were present in the Pituitary, Pineal, and Spleen tissue. Pituitary gland tissue expressed a significantly shorter period of Per1-luc expression from infected rats. In the Pineal gland, Per1 and Bmal1 expressed diurnal differences in both infected and control mice, and Clock gene mRNA expression was significantly reduced, indicating an alteration in rhythmic pineal function. Real-time PCR analysis revealed a significantly reduced expression of Bmal1 mRNA in the spleen of infected rats.

=== Funding ===
For current funding statistics, human African trypanosomiasis is grouped with kinetoplastid infections. Kinetoplastids refer to a group of flagellate protozoa. Kinetoplastid infections include African sleeping sickness, Chagas disease, and Leishmaniasis. Altogether, these three diseases accounted for 4.4 million disability adjusted life years (DALYs) and an additional 70,075 recorded deaths yearly. For kinetoplastid infections, the total global research and development funding was approximately $136.3 million in 2012. Each of the three diseases, African sleeping sickness, Chagas' disease, and Leishmaniasis each received approximately a third of the funding, which was about US$36.8 million, US$38.7 million, and US$31.7 million, respectively.

For sleeping sickness, funding was split into basic research, drug discovery, vaccines, and diagnostics. The greatest amount of funding was directed towards basic research of the disease; approximately US$21.6 million was directed towards that effort. As for therapeutic development, approximately $10.9 million was invested.

The top funders for kinetoplastid infection research and development are public sources. About 62% of the funding comes from high-income countries, while 9% comes from low- and middle-income countries. High-income countries' public funding is the largest contributor to neglected disease research efforts. However, in recent years, funding from high-income countries has been steadily decreasing; in 2007, high-income countries provided 67.5% of the total funding, whereas, in 2012, high-income countries' public funds provided only 60% of the total funding for kinetoplastid infections. This downward trend leaves a gap for other funders, such as philanthropic foundations and private pharmaceutical companies, to fill.

Much of the progress made in African sleeping sickness and neglected disease research as a whole is a result of the other non-public funders. One of these major sources of funding has come from foundations, which have increasingly become more committed to neglected disease drug discovery in the 21st century. In 2012, philanthropic sources provided 15.9% of the total funding. The Bill and Melinda Gates Foundation has been a leader in providing funding for neglected diseases drug development. They have provided US$444.1 million towards neglected disease research in 2012. To date, they have donated over US$1.02 billion towards the neglected disease discovery efforts.

For kinetoplastid infections specifically, they have donated an average of US$28.15 million annually between the years 2007 to 2011. They have labeled human African trypanosomiasis a high-opportunity target, meaning it is a disease that presents the greatest opportunity for control, elimination, and eradication, through the development of new drugs, vaccines, public health programs, and diagnostics. They are the second-highest funding source for neglected diseases, immediately behind the US National Institutes of Health. At a time when public funding is decreasing and government grants for scientific research are harder to obtain, the philanthropic world has stepped in to push the research forward.

Another important component of increased interest and funding has come from industry. In 2012, they contributed 13.1% total to the kinetoplastid research and development effort, and have additionally played an important role by contributing to public-private partnerships (PPP) as well as product-development partnerships (PDP). A public-private partnership is an arrangement between one or more public entities and one or more private entities that exists to achieve a specific health outcome or to produce a health product. The partnership can exist in numerous ways; they may share and exchange funds, property, equipment, human resources, and intellectual property. These public-private partnerships and product development partnerships have been established to address challenges in the pharmaceutical industry, especially related to neglected disease research. These partnerships can help increase the scale of the effort toward therapeutic development by using different knowledge, skills, and expertise from different sources. These types of partnerships are more effective than industry or public groups working independently.

== Other animals ==
Trypanosoma of both the rhodesiense and gambiense types can affect other animals such as cattle and wild animals. African trypanosomiasis has generally been considered an anthroponotic disease, and thus its control program was mainly focused on stopping the transmission by treating human cases and eliminating the vector. However, animal reservoirs were reported to possibly play an important role in the endemic nature of African trypanosomiasis, and for its resurgence in the historic foci of West and Central Africa.
