= Bernard Pécoul =

Bernard Pécoul is the founder and former executive director of the Geneva-based Drugs for Neglected Diseases initiative (DNDi) from 2003 until 2022. Prior to his involvement with the DNDi, Pécoul was executive director for Médecins Sans Frontières's campaign for Access to Essential Medicines, executive director of MSF-France, co-founder of the centre for epidemiological research Epicentre, and a MSF field physician in Africa, Latin America, and Asia. He is an outspoken patient advocate and proponent of increased research and development of treatments and innovation for neglected diseases.

== Education ==
Pécoul obtained his medical degree from the University of Clermont-Ferrand, France, and his Masters of Public Health from Tulane University in the US.

== Career ==
After graduating from medical school, Pécoul first managed public health projects for refugees from Vietnam, Burma and Laos. He joined MSF in 1983, and spent the next few years providing health services to refugees in Latin America. Returning to France in the late 80s, he co-founded Epicentre in Paris and lead their research and training until 1991. In that same year, he became the executive director for MSF's French section, which he would lead for the next seven years. He was the executive director of MSF's Campaign for Access to Essential Medicines until 2022.

Pécoul was one of the leading figures behind the launch of MSF's neglected diseases working group, which would become DNDi in 2003 under his management.

In 2002, Pécoul was awarded an honorary Doctor of Science degree from the University of Tulane, and in 2007, he was voted Doctor of the Year by Impact Médecine magazine in France. He was ABC news' Person of the Week in March 2007, and awarded the Prince Mahidol Award in the field of Public Health in 2020.
