= Drugs for Neglected Diseases Initiative =

Non-profit organization

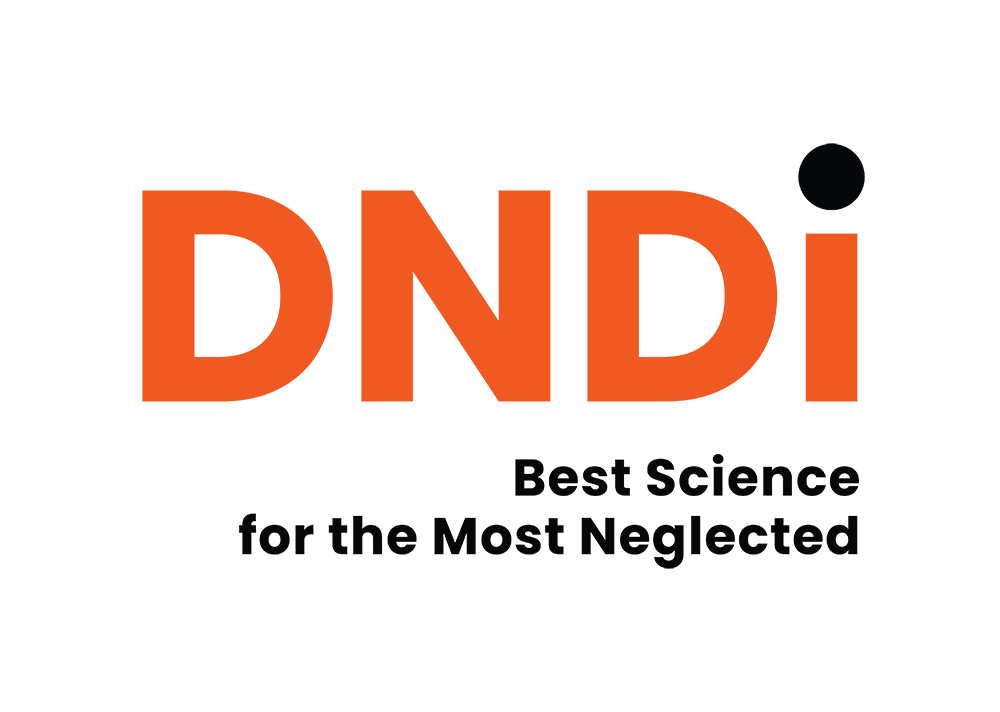
The logo of the Drugs for Neglected Diseases initiative (DNDi)

The Drugs for Neglected Diseases initiative (DNDi) is a collaborative, patients' needs-driven, non-profit drug research and development (R&D) organization that is developing new treatments for neglected diseases, notably leishmaniasis, sleeping sickness (human African trypanosomiasis, HAT), Chagas disease, malaria, filarial diseases, mycetoma, paediatric HIV, cryptococcal meningitis, hepatitis C, and dengue. DNDi's malaria activities were transferred to Medicines for Malaria Venture (MMV) in 2015.

Led by Executive Director Luis Pizarro, DNDi has offices in Switzerland (Geneva), Brazil, the Democratic Republic of Congo, India, Japan, Kenya, Malaysia, and an affiliate in the United States.

== Origins ==
Despite the major progress achieved in medicine during the past 50 years, many tropical diseases affecting the poorest are still neglected. More than a billion people – more than a seventh of the world's population – are infected with one of the 20 diseases listed by the World Health Organization (WHO) as neglected tropical diseases. Although neglected tropical diseases can be fatal, there is a lack of modern, safe and effective medications to treat these illnesses.

Evidence of the lack of new drugs for diseases that cause high mortality and morbidity among people living in poor areas has been published in the scientific literature. One publication reported that only 1.1% of new drugs were approved specifically for neglected diseases over a period of 25 years (1975 to 1999) despite the fact that these diseases represented 11.4% of the global burden. Another indicated that this trend remained the same between 2000 and 2011 with only 1.2% of the new chemical entities brought to market indicated for neglected diseases.

DNDi was created in 2003 to develop new treatments for neglected diseases. The organization was set up by key research and health institutions, notably from the public sector in neglected-disease-endemic countries – the Oswaldo Cruz Foundation from Brazil, the Indian Council of Medical Research, the Kenya Medical Research Institute, the Ministry of Health of Malaysia and France's Pasteur Institute, with seed funding from Médecins Sans Frontières' (MSF) 1999 Nobel Peace Prize. The WHO Special Programme for Research and Training in Tropical Diseases (TDR) acts as a permanent observer to the initiative.

DNDi's founder Bernard Pécoul led the organization from 2003 until 2022.

From 2022 until now, the organization has a new director, a Chilean doctor called Luis Pizarro.

== Non-profit drug development model ==
As people with neglected diseases do not represent a lucrative market for pharmaceutical companies, incentives to invest in research and development are lacking for these diseases.

Alternatives to profit-driven drug development emerged in the early 2000s to meet the needs of these neglected patients. Product development partnerships (PDPs), also called public-private partnerships (PPPs) aim to implement and accelerate research and development (R&D) into health tools (diagnostics, vaccines, drugs) for diseases that are neglected, by enabling new collaborations between private industry, academia, and the public sector. Examples of PDPs include the International AIDS Vaccine Initiative, MMV, the Global Alliance for TB Drug Development (TB Alliance), and DNDi.

PDPs act as 'conductors of a virtual orchestra', leveraging partners' specific assets, capacities, and expertise to implement projects at all stages of the R&D process, integrating capabilities from academia; public-sector research institutions, particularly in neglected disease-endemic countries; pharmaceutical and biotechnology companies; non-governmental organizations including other PDPs; and governments worldwide.

To overcome the lack of commercial research into drug development, PDPs can apply "delinkage" principles that aim to separate the cost of research and development from the price of products. This allows the incentive for investing in a particular disease to be independent of the price at which any developed products will be sold.

== Key achievements ==
DNDi has built a large drug pipeline for neglected diseases with both improvements on existing drugs and entirely new chemical entities. To date, their 13 key achievements are

Treatments delivered to date:

=== ASAQ, fixed-dose combination for malaria, 2007 ===
Launched in 2007, this antimalarial product is a fixed-dose combination of artesunate/amodiaquine (ASAQ). The result of a partnership between DNDi and French pharmaceutical company Sanofi, ASAQ, which is produced in Morocco, is affordable (available for only $0.05 for children, $1 for adults), is administered in a simple regimen (1 or 2 tablets per day for three days), meets the latest WHO guidelines for malaria treatment in Africa and was granted "pre-qualified" status in 2008. Although developed without a patent, ASAQ is included in the WHO Model List of Essential Medicines and Essential Medicines List for Children, is registered in 32 African countries, India, Ecuador, and in Colombia, and more than 437 million treatments have been distributed.

A technology transfer agreement has been signed with industrial partner Zenufa in Tanzania in order to provide an additional source of ASAQ. ASAQ was handed over to the MMV Access and Product Management Team in May 2015.

=== ASMQ, fixed-dose combination for malaria, 2008 ===
The second antimalarial treatment developed by DNDi is a fixed-dose combination of artesunate and mefloquine launched in 2008. It was developed by an international collaboration within the FACT Project Consortium. It has a simple and adapted regimen, a three-year shelf-ife and a very high compliance rate. ASMQ is produced in Brazil by Farmanguinhos/Fiocruz and thanks to a South–South technology transfer, it is now also produced by Cipla. The latter was granted "pre-qualified" status by the WHO in 2012 and included on the WHO Model List of Essential Medicines and Essential Medicines List for Children in 2013. By 2015 it was registered in Brazil, India, Malaysia, Myanmar, Tanzania, Vietnam, Niger, Burkina Faso, Thailand and Cambodia. By the end of 2015 more than one million treatments had been distributed. ASMQ was handed over to the MMV Access and Product Management Team in May 2015.

=== NECT, improved treatment for sleeping sickness, 2009 ===
Nifurtimox-eflornithine combination treatment (NECT), a combination therapy of nifurtimox and eflornithine, is the first new, improved treatment option in 25 years for stage 2 (advanced stage) human African trypanosomiasis (HAT) also known as sleeping sickness. It is the result of a six-year partnership between NGOs, governments, pharmaceutical companies, and the WHO. It was launched in 2009 and included on the WHO Model List of Essential Medicines and WHO Essential Medicines List for Children in 2009 and 2013 respectively. It requires shorter hospitalization than previous treatment, and is much safer than previously widely used arsenic-based melarsoprol that killed about 5% of patients. NECT is now used to treat 100% of the patients infected with HAT stage 2 in all 13 endemic countries.

=== SSG&PM, combination treatment for visceral leishmaniasis, 2010 ===
SSG&PM, a sodium stibogluconate plus paromomycin combination therapy, is a shorter-course, cost-efficient treatment option against visceral leishmaniasis (VL) in East Africa available since 2010. It is the result of a six-year partnership between DNDi, the Leishmaniasis East Africa Platform (LEAP), the National Control Programmes of Kenya, Sudan, Ethiopia, and Uganda, Médecins Sans Frontières (MSF) and the WHO. It was recommended by the WHO Expert Committee on the Control of Leishmaniasis in 2010 as the first-line treatment in East Africa, and more than 10,000 patients have been treated. Sudan, Ethiopia, South Sudan and Somalia have released revised guidelines recommending SSG&PM as the first-line treatment for VL.

=== Combination treatments for visceral leishmaniasis in Asia, 2011 ===
Single dose amphotericin B and paromomycin/miltefosine/amphotericin B combinations were recommended by the WHO Expert Committee on the Control of Leishmaniasis (2010). These treatments are less toxic than previous mainstay treatments, useful in areas of antimonial resistance, are shorter course and their cost is comparable with previous treatments. In 2010, a study investigating the three possible 2-drug combinations of amphotericin B, miltefosine and paromomycin was completed in India. All three combination treatments were shown to be highly efficacious (> 97.5% cure rate). A WHO Expert committee recommended these treatments to be used preferentially to current established monotherapy treatments for VL in South Asia. DNDi is working with TDR and WHO to facilitate their introduction and support VL elimination strategies. DNDi conducted more studies, including a pilot project in the Bihar State of India (2012–2015) that demonstrated the safety and effectiveness of combination therapies based on amphotericin B, miltefosine, and paromomycin at the primary healthcare level, and single dose amphotericin B at the hospital level. Based on the study results, the Indian National Roadmap for Kala-Azar Elimination in August 2014 recommended use of single dose amphotericin B as a first option treatment for the treatment of VL patients, with paromomycin and miltefosine as a second option at all levels; a policy also reflected in Bangladesh and Nepal. This removal of miltefosine monotherapy is an important policy change. This project has been a collaboration with a consortium of partners.

=== Paediatric benznidazole for Chagas disease, 2011 ===
This is the only paediatric dosage treatment for Chagas disease, launched in 2011 through a collaboration between DNDi and Laboratório Farmacêutico do Estado de Pernambuco (LAFEPE). In November 2013, the Mundo Sano Foundation and DNDi signed a collaboration agreement to deliver a second source of the treatment in partnership with ELEA. The paediatric dosage form of benznidazole is designed for infants and young children under two years of age (20 kg body weight) infected congenitally. Thanks to its age-adapted, easy-to-use, affordable, and non-patented tablet, the new treatment contributes to improved dosing accuracy, safety, and adherence to treatment. The paediatric dosage form of benznidazole was granted registration by Brazil's National Health Surveillance Agency in 2011, and further endemic countries are targeted for obtaining registration. It was included on the WHO Essential Medicines List for Children in July 2013.

=== Superbooster therapy for children living with HIV and tuberculosis, 2016 ===
Among the many challenges of treating children co-infected with both tuberculosis (TB) and HIV is the fact that a key TB drug negates the effectiveness of ritonavir, one of the main antiretrovirals to treat HIV. A DNDi-sponsored study at five hospitals in South Africa demonstrated the effectiveness of 'super-boosting' or adding extra ritonavir to a child's treatment regimen. WHO has since strengthened recommendations to use super-boosting in TB/HIV co-infected children.

=== Fexinidazole, 2018 ===
Fexinidazole is the first entirely oral treatment for sleeping sickness (or human African trypanosomiase) due to Trypanosoma brucei gambiense. It was developed in partnership by DNDi, Sanofi, and others. The clinical trials enrolled 749 patients from the Democratic Republic of the Congo and the Central African Republic. Results published in The Lancet showed high efficacy and safety for both stages of the disease. Fexinidazole is administered as oral tablets for 10 days.

In November 2018, the European Medicines Agency adopted a positive scientific opinion of fexinidazole. In December 2018, fexinidazole was approved in the Democratic Republic of the Congo.

Other project:

=== Global Antibiotic Research & Development Partnership ===
In 2016, the WHO and DNDi collaborated to launch the Global Antibiotic Research and Development Partnership (GARDP), a not-for-profit research and development organization that addresses global public health needs by developing and delivering new or improved antibiotic treatments, while endeavouring to ensure their sustainable access. In 2018, GARDP was organized as an independent legal entity.

=== Ravidasvir, 2021 ===
Access to affordable hepatitis C treatment with highly efficacious direct-acting antivirals (DAAs) remains extremely limited in many low- and middle-income countries. In 2016, DNDi signed agreements with US biopharmaceutical company Presidio Pharmaceuticals, developer of the DAA drug candidate ravidasvir, and its licensing partner, the Egyptian generic manufacturer Pharco Pharmaceuticals, to enable testing of a new combination treatment optimised for public health use: ravidasvir + sofosbuvir. A Phase II/III study in Malaysia and Thailand, co-sponsored by the Malaysian and Thai Ministries of Health and co-financed by the MSF Transformational Investment Capacity (TIC) initiative, showed that 12 weeks after the end of treatment, 97% of participants were cured. Patients with multiple risk factors were cured, and no unexpected safety signals were detected. In June 2021, Malaysia granted a conditional registration for ravidasvir.

=== New treatments for HIV/VL, 2022 ===
Leishmania-HIV coinfection has been reported from 35 endemic countries [http://www.who.int/news-room/fact-sheets/detail/leishmaniasis]. People co-infected with HIV and visceral leishmaniasis have poor response to treatment, higher risk of death, and often experience multiple relapse episodes. Based on the results of two studies, in June 2022 WHO released new treatment guidelines for the treatment of people co-infected with visceral leishmaniasis and HIV, recommending a combination of liposomal amphotericin B with miltefosine.

=== Leishmaniasis in Latin America, 2022 ===
Previously, first-line treatment recommendations for visceral leishmaniasis in Brazil included the use of meglumine antimoniate, which has serious limitations due to toxicity, parenteral administration, and the need for hospitalization. Results of a trial in partnership with the University of Brasilia and the Oswaldo Cruz Foundation of Brazil showed that due to lower toxicity and acceptable efficacy, liposomal amphotericin B would be a more suitable first-line treatment for visceral leishmaniasis than standard treatment. In June 2022, the Pan American Health Organization (PAHO) published new guidelines for the treatment of leishmaniasis in the Americas, which recommend liposomal amphotericin B for the treatment of visceral leishmaniasis instead of pentavalent antimonials.

=== 4-in-1 for paediatric HIV, 2022 ===
This '4-in-1' fixed-dose combination combines the protease inhibitors lopinavir and ritonavir with the nucleoside reverse transcriptase inhibitors (NRTIs) lamivudine and abacavir for the treatment of paediatric HIV. The 4-in-1 is a significant improvement over currently available lopinavir-based regimens, because it is formulated as a granule-filled capsule, which is heat-stable, taste-masked, solid, and does not contain alcohol or inappropriate solvents. It was developed for infants and young children weighing from 3 to 25 kg, in partnership with Cipla Limited. It can be administered by opening the capsules and sprinkling the granules on soft food, water, or milk. The South African Health Products Regulatory Authority (SAHPRA) approved the 4-in-1 in June 2022.

=== Acoziborole, single-dose treatment for sleeping sickness, 2026 ===
Acoziborole is the first single-dose oral treatment for both stages of T.b. gambiense sleeping sickness, the most common form of the disease. Its safety and simplicity allow the treatment to be provided at the village level, which could revolutionize the management of the disease and lead to its elimination by 2030. The European Medicines Agency adopted a positive scientific opinion on acoziborole in February 2026, paving the way for registration and distribution in endemic countries. Acoziborole is the result of more than two decades of innovation efforts by DNDi, Sanofi, and partners.

=== Miltefosine + paromomycin for visceral leishmaniasis in Africa, 2026 ===
A Phase III trial conducted by AfriKADIA Consortium partners in Kenya, Ethiopia, Sudan, and Uganda in 2018 found that treatment with miltefosine plus paromomycin was as effective as the standard treatment sodium stibogluconate plus paromomycin, but with fewer injections, a shorter treatment duration, and no risk of sodium stibogluconate-related cardiotoxicity.

In July 2026, the World Health Organization (WHO) issued major updates to its leishmaniasis treatment guidelines, which now recommend miltefosine and paromomycin for the treatment of visceral leishmaniasis in eastern Africa.

=== New treatments for Post-kala-azar dermal leishmaniasis in Eastern Africa, 2026 ===
Antimonial-based treatments for post-kala-azar dermal leishmaniasis are expensive and lengthy, with complex administration and potentially life-threatening side effects, including cardiotoxicity. A Phase II study sponsored by DNDi in Sudan demonstrated that combinations of miltefosine with paromomycin and miltefosine with liposomal amphotericin B were safe and effective for the treatment of patients with post-kala-azar dermal leishmaniasis. In July 2026, the World Health Organization (WHO) issued major updates to its leishmaniasis treatment guidelines, which now recommend these combinations for the treatment of PKDL in Eastern Africa.

=== Safer, shorter treatments for people with post-kala-azar dermal leishmaniasis in South Asia, 2026 ===
DNDi’s Phase II study in India and Bangladesh demonstrated that two treatments, liposomal amphotericin B in monotherapy and in combination with short-course miltefosine, were safe and effective. In July 2026, the World Health Organization (WHO) issued major updates to its leishmaniasis treatment guidelines, which now recommend liposomal amphotericin B monotherapy or a combination of liposomal amphotericin B and short-course miltefosine for the treatment of PKDL in South Asia. The new treatments shorten the treatment duration from 12 weeks to three compared with the previous standard of care.

== Awards ==
In 2013, DNDi won the BBVA Foundation Frontiers of Knowledge Award in the Development Cooperation category for developing and delivering new treatments for poverty-related diseases including Chagas disease, sleeping sickness, malaria and leishmaniasis.

DNDi received the Carlos Slim Health Award in 2013. Created in 2008 by the Carlos Slim Foundation, the aim of the award is to distinguish the people and institutions who are committed to improving the levels of health among the population of Latin America and the Caribbean.

In 2013, The Rockefeller Foundation asked the global community to nominate organizations and individuals who were making a difference for poor and vulnerable populations through innovation. From those nominations, and the votes of individuals around the world, The Rockefeller Foundation selected three winners of the 2013 Next Century Innovators Award. DNDi was one of the awardees.

On December 11, 2015, DNDi won the national FINEP Award for Innovation. The award was in recognition of an innovative R&D model that has delivered a new antimalarial drug developed in Brazil.

DNDi received the prize for innovation in 2017 and the 'cuvée 2018 de la Vigne des Nations' in 2018, both from the Canton of Geneva.

The publication Oral fexinidazole for late-stage African Trypanosoma brucei gambiense trypanosomiasis: a pivotal multicentre, randomised, non-inferiority trial published November 4, 2017 in The Lancet was one of the two winners of the 2018 edition of the Anne Maurer-Cecchini Award.

A short film about fexinidazole, a new treatment for sleeping sickness, was awarded the Grand Prix at the inaugural World Health Organization 'Health for All' film festival in 2020. 'A doctor's dream' was produced by DNDi with Scholars and Gentlemen, a production company from South Africa.

In 2023, the organization was awarded the Princess of Asturias Award in the category of "International Cooperation".

== Regional clinical trial platforms ==
DNDi works with partners in disease-endemic countries to strengthen existing clinical research capacity and build new capacity where necessary. DNDi helped in the setting up of four regional disease-specific platforms in Africa and Latin America including the Leishmaniasis East Africa Platform (LEAP) on leishmaniasis. the HAT Platform on sleeping sickness (human African trypanosomiasis), the Chagas Clinical Research Platform (CCRP), and the RedeLeish Network on leishmaniasis in Latin America and continues to work with them.

Their mission is to define patient needs, taking into consideration the local conditions, bring together key regional actors in the field of health, reinforce clinical capacities in endemic regions, address infrastructural requirements where necessary and provide on-site training.

== Long-term objective ==
As part of its Strategic Plan 2021–2028, DNDi aims to deliver 15 to 18 new treatments, for a total of 25 new treatments in its first 25 years.

== See also ==
- Neglected tropical diseases
- Fexinidazole
- Artemisinin
- Quinine
