= Acoziborole =

Antiprotozoal drug to treat sleeping sickness

Clinical data
- Other names: SCYX-7158
- ATC code: None

Identifiers
- IUPAC name: 4-fluoro-N-(1-hydroxy-3,3-dimethyl-2,1-benzoxaborol-6-yl)-2-(trifluoromethyl)benzamide
- CAS Number: 1266084-51-8
- PubChem CID: 44178354
- ChemSpider: 29407646
- UNII: 2IOR2OO3GW
- CompTox Dashboard (EPA): DTXSID301336035

Chemical and physical data
- Formula: C_{17}H_{14}BF_{4}NO_{3}
- Molar mass: 367.11 g·mol^{−1}
- 3D model (JSmol): Interactive image
- SMILES: CC2(C)OB(O)c3c2ccc(c3)NC(=O)c1ccc(F)cc1C(F)(F)F
- InChI: InChI=1S/C17H14BF4NO3/c1-16(2)12-6-4-10(8-14(12)18(25)26-16)23-15(24)11-5-3-9(19)7-13(11)17(20,21)22/h3-8,25H,1-2H3,(H,23,24); Key:PTYGDEXEGLDNAZ-UHFFFAOYSA-N

Acoziborole (trade name Acoziborole Winthrop) is a benzoxaborole antiprotozoal medication used to treat sleeping sickness caused by Trypanosoma brucei gambiense. It is taken by mouth as a single dose and is indicated for both stages of the disease, including severe second-stage disease, in adults and in adolescents aged 12 years or older.

Acoziborole was developed by the Drugs for Neglected Diseases Initiative, Sanofi, and their partners. In February 2026, the European Medicines Agency's Committee for Medicinal Products for Human Use issued a positive scientific opinion under the EU-M4all procedure for medicines intended for use outside the European Union. The Democratic Republic of the Congo approved acoziborole in June 2026.

== Medical uses ==
Acoziborole is used to treat first- and second-stage african trypanosomiasis caused by Trypanosoma brucei gambiense, including severe second-stage disease. It is given as a single oral dose to adults and to adolescents aged 12 years or older who weigh at least 40 kg.

In a single-arm phase II/III trial in the Democratic Republic of the Congo and Guinea, treatment was successful at 18 months in about 95% of the 167 participants with second-stage disease and in all 41 participants with first- or intermediate-stage disease.

== Pharmacology ==
=== Pharmacodynamics ===
Acoziborole is thought to inhibit cleavage and polyadenylation specificity factor 3 (CPSF3), an enzyme involved in messenger RNA maturation in Trypanosoma brucei.

=== Pharmacokinetics ===
In people with gambiense sleeping sickness, blood concentrations peaked at a median of 48 hours after a single oral dose taken while fasting. The mean terminal elimination half-life was 12.3 days. Acoziborole undergoes limited metabolism and is eliminated mainly in the faeces via the bile.

== History ==
Acoziborole originated from a compound identified by Anacor Pharmaceuticals. The Drugs for Neglected Diseases Initiative (DNDi) worked with Scynexis and Pace University to optimise the compound, yielding the clinical candidate SCYX-7158, also known as AN5568. It entered clinical trials in 2012, and DNDi announced completion of the first phase I study in September 2015.

A phase II/III trial enrolled participants with gambiense sleeping sickness in the Democratic Republic of the Congo and Guinea from 2016 to 2019. Its results were published in November 2022. DNDi and Sanofi co-developed acoziborole, which Sanofi submitted to the European Medicines Agency for review under the EU-M4all procedure.
