= Fexinidazole =

Oral anti-parasitic medical drug

Clinical data
- Other names: Fexinidazole Winthrop; HOE 239
- License data: US DailyMed: Fexinidazole
- Routes of administration: By mouth
- ATC code: P01CA03 (WHO)

Legal status
- Legal status: US: ℞-only

Identifiers
- IUPAC name: 1-Methyl-2-{[4-(methylsulfanyl)phenoxy]methyl}-5-nitro-1H-imidazole
- CAS Number: 59729-37-2
- PubChem CID: 68792
- DrugBank: DB12265
- ChemSpider: 62032
- UNII: 306ERL82IR
- KEGG: D11252
- ChEMBL: ChEMBL1631694
- CompTox Dashboard (EPA): DTXSID00208448
- ECHA InfoCard: 100.207.619

Chemical and physical data
- Formula: C_{12}H_{13}N_{3}O_{3}S
- Molar mass: 279.31 g·mol^{−1}
- 3D model (JSmol): Interactive image
- SMILES: [O-] [N+](=O)c1cnc(n1C)COc2ccc(SC)cc2
- InChI: InChI=1S/C12H13N3O3S/c1-14-11(13-7-12(14)15(16)17)8-18-9-3-5-10(19-2)6-4-9/h3-7H,8H2,1-2H3; Key:MIWWSGDADVMLTG-UHFFFAOYSA-N

Fexinidazole is a medication used to treat African trypanosomiasis (sleeping sickness) caused by Trypanosoma brucei gambiense. It is effective against both first and second stage disease. It is taken by mouth.

Common side effects include nausea, vomiting, headache, and trouble sleeping. Other side effects may include QT prolongation, psychosis, and low white blood cells. It is unclear if use during pregnancy or breast feeding is safe. Fexinidazole is in the antiparasitic and the nitroimidazole family of medications. It is believed to work by turning on certain enzymes within the parasites that result in their death.

Fexinidazole was first described in 1978. It was given a positive opinion by the European Medicines Agency in 2018. It is on the World Health Organization's List of Essential Medicines. Fexinidazole was developed for sleeping sickness by the Drugs for Neglected Diseases initiative in collaboration with Sanofi. Fexinidazole was approved for medical use in the United States in July 2021.

== Medical use ==
=== Sleeping sickness ===
A trial in Africa found fexinidazole to be 91% effective at treating sleeping sickness. Though less effective than nifurtimox with eflornithine in severe disease, fexinidazole has the benefit that it can be taken by mouth.

Fexinidazole is the first drug candidate for the treatment of advanced-stage sleeping sickness in thirty years.

=== Efficacy and safety ===
In cell culture, fexinidazole has an IC_{50} of around 1–4 μM against Trypanosoma brucei. In the mouse model, fexinidazole cures both the first, hemolymphatic, and the second, meningoencephalitic stage of the infection, the latter at 100 mg/kg twice daily for 5 days. In patients, the clinical trials managed by DNDi and supported by Swiss TPH mainly conducted in the Democratic Republic of the Congo demonstrated that oral fexinidazole is safe and effective for use against first- and early second-stage sleeping sickness. Based on the positive opinion issued by the European Medicines Agency in 2018, the WHO has released new interim guidelines for the treatment of HAT including fexinidazole as the new therapy for first-stage and non-severe second-stage sleeping sickness caused by Trypanosoma brucei gambiense (gHAT) Recently, a study of the safety and efficacy of oral fexinidazole in children with gambiense human African trypanosomiasis was accomplished and concluded that orally administered fexinidazole showed high efficacy across all stages of gambiense human African trypanosomiasis infection in children aged 6 years and older and weighing more than 20 kg. The benefit-to-risk ratio of fexinidazole for treating children with gambiense human African trypanosomiasis, regardless of disease stage, is positive. Current interventions for diagnosing, staging, and treating gambiense human African trypanosomiasis require resources, trained personnel, equipment, and hospital infrastructure. These potentially costly procedures are therefore difficult to implement in remote areas or in those that might be mired in conflict, which could prevent the goal of eliminating gambiense human African trypanosomiasis by 2030.

Simplified oral treatments such as fexinidazole or single-dose oral treatments such as acoziborole (currently in clinical trials) that can cure both disease stages of gambiense human African trypanosomiasis and circumvent the need for systematic disease staging with lumbar puncture (a procedure associated with complications and anxiety, particularly in children) would benefit both patients and health-care professionals Furthermore, Damasio et al. evaluated the in vivo oral efficacy of self-emulsifying drug delivery systems (SEDDS) containing fexinidazole in the experimental treatment of visceral leishmaniasis (VL). The developed FEX-SEDDS formulation presented as a clear, yellowish liquid without precipitate. In the simulated gastric and intestinal media, the FEX-SEDDS had a size of 97±1 and 106±9 nm, respectively. The FEX retention in droplets after SEDDS dilution in simulated gastrointestinal media was almost 100%. Antileishmanial efficacy studies showed that FEX-SEDDS was the only treatment able to significantly (p < 0.05) reduce the parasite burden in the liver and spleen of animals experimentally infected with Leishmania infantum.

== Mechanism of action ==
The biologically relevant active metabolites in vivo are the sulfoxide and sulfone.

== History ==
Fexinidazole was discovered by the German pharmaceutical company Hoechst AG, but its development as a pharmaceutical was halted in the 1980s.

The US Food and Drug Administration granted the application for fexinidazole orphan drug designation.

== Society and culture ==
Fexinidazole Winthrop, a Sanofi-Aventis product developed with the Drugs for Neglected Diseases Initiative (DNDi), received a positive endorsement from the European Medicines Agency in 2018, for use in non-European markets. It was approved for the treatment of Trypanosoma brucei gambiense human African trypanosomiasis (HAT) in the Democratic Republic of the Congo (DRC) in December 2018. Fexinidazole was included in the 'role of honour' in Préscrire magazine's 2020 prize list.

By 2016, the development cost of fexinidazole has reached $45 million: the final total cost was €55 million.

== Veterinary use ==
Fexinidazole is promising in African animal trypanosomiasis. Torreele et al. found the drug to be effective against T. b. gambiense infection of mice, rats, rabbits and beagles. They also found no toxicity in any of them, including a lack of mutagenicity despite in vitro mutagenicity.

== Synthesis ==
Fexinidazole is synthesized in five steps from nitroimidazole.

Synthetic pathway of fexinidzaole, adapted from Scheme 3 of McInturff et al. 2023.
