= WHO Model List of Essential Medicines for Children =

Formulary

The WHO Model List of Essential Medicines for Children (a.k.a. Essential Medicines List for Children or EMLc), published by the World Health Organization (WHO), contains the medications considered to be most effective and safe for children up to twelve years of age to meet the most important needs in a health system.

The list is divided into core items and complementary items. The core items are deemed to be the most cost-effective options for key health problems and are usable with little additional health care resources. The complementary items either require additional infrastructure, such as specially trained health care providers, or diagnostic equipment or have a lower benefit–cost ratio.

The first list for children was created in 2007, and the list is in its 10th edition as of 2025.

Note: An α indicates a medicine is on the complementary list.

== Anaesthetics, preoperative medicines and medical gases ==
=== General anaesthetics and oxygen ===
==== Inhalational medicines ====
- Isoflurane
- Nitrous oxide (Note: Piped nitrous oxide is a major source of atmospheric pollution from healthcare facilities. Point-of-care cylinders are the preferred delivery system over centrally-supplied (piped) delivery systems)
- Oxygen
- Sevoflurane

==== Injectable medicines ====
- Ketamine
- Propofol (Note: Thiopental is an alternative)

=== Local anaesthetics ===
- Bupivacaine
- Lidocaine
- Lidocaine/epinephrine (lidocaine + epinephrine (adrenaline))

=== Preoperative medication and sedation for short-term procedures ===
- Atropine
- Midazolam
- Morphine

=== Medical gases ===
- Oxygen (Note: No more than 30% oxygen should be used to initiate resuscitation of neonates less than or equal to 32 weeks of gestation.)

== Medicines for pain and palliative care ==
=== Non-opioids and non-steroidal anti-inflammatory medicines (NSAIMs) ===
- Ibuprofen (Note: Not in children less than three months.)
- Paracetamol (Note: Not recommended for anti‐inflammatory use due to lack of proven benefit to that effect.) (acetaminophen)

=== Opioid analgesics ===
- Morphine (Note: Hydromorphone and oxycodone are alternatives)

Complementary:

- Methadone^{α} (Note: For the management of cancer pain)

=== Medicines for other common symptoms in palliative care ===
- Amitriptyline
- Cyclizine
- Dexamethasone
- Diazepam
- Docusate sodium
- Hyoscine hydrobromide
- Lactulose
- Midazolam (Note: May be used for buccal administration when solution for oromucosal administration is not available)
- Ondansetron (Note: Dolasetron, granisetron, palonosetron, and tropisetron are alternatives)
- Senna

== Antiallergics and medicines used in anaphylaxis ==
- Dexamethasone
- Epinephrine (adrenaline)
- Hydrocortisone
- Loratadine (Note: Cetirizine and fexofenadine are alternatives) (Note: There may be a role for sedating antihistamines for limited indications.)
- Prednisolone (Note: Prednisone is an alternative)

== Antidotes and other substances used in poisonings ==
=== Non-specific ===
- Charcoal, activated (Note: Alternative formulations of activated charcoal may be used if granules are not available)

=== Specific ===
- Acetylcysteine
- Atropine
- Calcium gluconate
- Naloxone

Complementary:

- Deferoxamine^{α}
- Dimercaprol^{α}
- Fomepizole^{α}
- Sodium calcium edetate^{α}
- Succimer^{α}

== Medicines for neurological disorders ==
=== Medicines for central nervous system disorders ===
==== Antiseizure medicines ====
- Carbamazepine
- Diazepam
- Lamotrigine (Note: For use as adjunctive therapy for treatment-resistant partial or generalized seizures.)
- Levetiracetam
- Lorazepam (Note: Diazepam (injection) and midazolam (injection) are alternatives)
- Magnesium sulfate (Note: For use in eclampsia and severe pre‐eclampsia and not for other convulsant disorders)
- Midazolam
- Phenobarbital
- Phenytoin
- Prednisolone
- Valproic acid (sodium valproate) (Note: Valproic acid (sodium valproate) is not recommended in women and girls of childbearing potential owing to the high risk of birth defects and neurodevelopmental disorders in children exposed to valproic acid (sodium valproate) in the womb)

Complementary:

- Ethosuximide^{α}
- Levetiracetam^{α}
- Valproic acid (sodium valproate)^{α}

==== Medicines for multiple sclerosis ====
No listings in this section.

==== Medicines for parkinsonism ====
No listings in this section.

==== Medicines for cerebral palsy ====
Complementary:

- Baclofen^{α}

==== Medicines for headache disorders ====
===== Medicines for acute migraine attacks =====
- Ibuprofen
- Paracetamol (acetaminophen) (Note: The presence of both 120 mg/5 mL and 125 mg/5mL strengths on the same market would cause confusion in prescribing and dispensing and should be avoided)

===== Medicines for migraine prophylaxis =====
- Propranolol

===== Medicines for cluster headache =====
No listings in this section.

==== Medicines for central nervous system infections ====
===== Medicines for bacterial central nervous system infections =====
- Amoxicillin
- Ampicillin
- Benzylpenicillin
- Cefotaxime (Note: Third-generation cephalosporin of choice for use in hospitalized neonates)
- Ceftriaxone (Note: Do not administer with calcium and avoid in infants with hyperbilirubinemia) (Note: > 41 weeks corrected gestational age)
- Chloramphenicol (Note: Only for the presumptive treatment of epidemic meningitis in children older than two years)
- Gentamicin

Complementary:

- Meropenem^{α} (Note: > three months)

===== Medicines for viral central nervous system infections =====
- Aciclovir

=== Medicines for peripheral nervous system disorders ===
==== Medicines for Guillain-Barré syndrome ====
Complementary:

- Normal immunoglobulin^{α}

==== Medicines for myasthenia gravis ====
- Neostigmine

Complementary:

- Pyridostigmine^{α}

== Anti-infective medicines ==
=== Anthelminthics ===
==== Intestinal anthelminthics ====
A skeletal model of the chemical structure of albendazole

- Albendazole
- Ivermectin
- Levamisole
- Mebendazole
- Niclosamide
- Praziquantel
- Pyrantel

==== Antifilarials ====
- Albendazole
- Diethylcarbamazine
- Ivermectin (Note: Moxidectin is an alternative)

==== Antischistosomals and other antinematode medicines ====
- Praziquantel (Note: Arpraziquantel is an alternative)
- Triclabendazole

Complementary:

- Oxamniquine^{α} (Note: For use when praziquantel treatment fails.)

==== Cysticidal medicines ====
Complementary:

- Albendazole^{α}
- Mebendazole^{α}
- Praziquantel^{α}

=== Antibacterials ===
==== Access group antibiotics ====
- Amikacin
- Amoxicillin
- Amoxicillin/clavulanic acid (amoxicillin + clavulanic acid)
- Ampicillin
- Benzathine benzylpenicillin
- Benzylpenicillin
- Cefalexin
- Cefazolin (Note: > 1 month.)
- Chloramphenicol (Note: Only for the presumptive treatment of epidemic meningitis in children older than two years.)
- Clindamycin
- Cloxacillin (Note: Alternatives are 4th level ATC chemical subgroup (J01CF Beta-lactamase resistant penicillins)) (Note: Cloxacillin, dicloxacillin, and flucloxacillin are preferred for oral administration due to better bioavailability)
- Doxycycline (Note: Use in children <8 years only for life-threatening infections when no alternative exists.)
- Gentamicin
- Metronidazole
- Nitrofurantoin
- Phenoxymethylpenicillin (penicillin V)
- Procaine benzylpenicillin (Note: Procaine benzylpenicillin is not recommended as first-line treatment for neonatal sepsis except in settings with high neonatal mortality, when given by trained health workers in cases where hospital care is not achievable.)
- Sulfamethoxazole/trimethoprim (sulfamethoxazole + trimethoprim)
- Trimethoprim

==== Watch group antibiotics ====
- Azithromycin
- Cefixime
- Cefotaxime (Note: Third-generation cephalosporin of choice for use in hospitalized neonates.)
- Ceftriaxone
- Cefuroxime
- Ciprofloxacin
- Clarithromycin (Note: Erythromycin is an alternative.)
- Piperacillin/tazobactam (piperacillin + tazobactam)
- Vancomycin (Note: Vancomycin powder for injection may also be used for oral administration)

Complementary:

- Ceftazidime^{α}
- Meropenem^{α} (Note: Imipenem/cilastatin is an alternative for complicated intraabdominal infections and high-risk febrile neutropenia only. Meropenem is the preferred choice for acute bacterial meningitis in neonates)
- Vancomycin^{α}

==== Reserve group antibiotics ====
Complementary:

- Ceftazidime/avibactam (ceftazidime + avibactam)^{α}
- Ceftolozane/tazobactam (ceftolozane + tazobactam)^{α}
- Colistin^{α}
- Fosfomycin^{α}
- Linezolid^{α}
- Polymyxin B^{α}

==== Antileprosy medicines ====
- Clofazimine
- Dapsone
- Rifampicin

==== Antituberculosis medicines ====
- Amikacin
- Amoxicillin/clavulanic acid (amoxicillin + clavulanic acid) (Note: For use only in combination with meropenem)
- Bedaquiline
- Clofazimine
- Cycloserine
- Delamanid
- Ethambutol
- Ethionamide (Note: Prothionamide is an alternative for multidrug-resistant tuberculosis)
- Isoniazid
- Isoniazid/pyrazinamide/rifampicin (isoniazid + pyrazinamide + rifampicin)
- Isoniazid/rifampicin (isoniazid + rifampicin)
- Isoniazid/rifapentine (isoniazid + rifapentine)
- Levofloxacin
- Linezolid
- Meropenem (Note: Imipenem/cilastatin is an alternative)
- Moxifloxacin
- P-aminosalicylate sodium
- Pyrazinamide
- Rifampicin
- Rifapentine
- Streptomycin

=== Antifungal medicines ===
- Amphotericin B
- Fluconazole
- Flucytosine
- Griseofulvin
- Itraconazole (Note: For treatment of chronic pulmonary aspergillosis, histoplasmosis, sporotrichosis, paracoccidioidomycosis, mycoses caused by T. marneffei and chromoblastomycosis; and prophylaxis of histoplasmosis and infections caused by T. marneffei in AIDS patients)
- Nystatin
- Voriconazole (Note: For treatment of chronic pulmonary aspergillosis and acute invasive aspergillosis)

Complementary:

- Micafungin^{α} (Note: Anidulafungin and caspofungin are alternatives)
- Potassium iodide^{α}

=== Antiviral medicines ===
==== Antiherpes medicines ====
- Aciclovir

==== Antiretrovirals ====
===== Nucleoside/nucleotide reverse transcriptase inhibitors =====
- Lamivudine
- Zidovudine

===== Non-nucleoside reverse transcriptase inhibitors =====
- Nevirapine (Note: > six weeks)

===== Protease inhibitors =====
- Darunavir (Note: > three years)
- Lopinavir/ritonavir (lopinavir + ritonavir)
- Ritonavir

===== Integrase inhibitors =====
- Dolutegravir (Note: ≥ 4 weeks and ≥ 3 kg; ≥ 25 kg)
- Raltegravir (Note: For use in second-line regimens in accordance with WHO treatment guidelines)

===== Fixed-dose combinations of antiretroviral medicines =====
- Abacavir/dolutegravir/lamivudine (abacavir + dolutegravir + lamivudine)
- Abacavir/lamivudine (abacavir + lamivudine)
- Lamivudine/zidovudine (lamivudine + zidovudine)

===== Medicines for prevention of HIV-related opportunistic infections =====
- Isoniazid/pyridoxine/sulfamethoxazole/trimethoprim (isoniazid + pyridoxine + sulfamethoxazole + trimethoprim)

==== Other antivirals ====
Complementary:

- Oseltamivir^{α} (Note: Severe illness due to confirmed or suspected influenza virus infection in critically ill hospitalized patients)
- Valganciclovir^{α} (Note: For the treatment of cytomegalovirus retinitis (CMVr).)

==== Antihepatitis medicines ====
===== Medicines for hepatitis B =====
====== Nucleoside/Nucleotide reverse transcriptase inhibitors ======
- Entecavir

===== Medicines for hepatitis C =====
====== Pangenotypic direct-acting antiviral combinations ======
- Daclatasvir (Note: Pangenotypic when used in combination with sofosbuvir)
- Daclatasvir/sofosbuvir (daclatasvir + sofosbuvir)
- Glecaprevir/pibrentasvir (glecaprevir + pibrentasvir)
- Sofosbuvir (Note: Pangenotypic when used in combination with daclatasvir)
- Sofosbuvir/velpatasvir (sofosbuvir + velpatasvir)

====== Non-pangenotypic direct-acting antiviral combinations ======
No listings in this section.

====== Other antivirals for hepatitis C ======
No listings in this section.

=== Antiprotozoal medicines ===
==== Antiamoebic and antigiardiasis medicines ====
- Diloxanide (Note: Proposed for deletion in 2027)
- Metronidazole (Note: Tinidazole is an alternative)

==== Antileishmaniasis medicines ====
- Amphotericin B (Note: Liposomal amphotericin B has a better safety profile than the sodium deoxycholate formulation and should be prioritized for selection and use depending on local availability and cost)
- Meglumine antimoniate
- Miltefosine
- Paromomycin
- Sodium stibogluconate

==== Antimalarial medicines ====
===== Medicines for curative treatment =====
- Artemether (Note: For use in the management of severe malaria)
- Artemether/lumefantrine (artemether + lumefantrine)
- Artesunate (Note: For pre-referral treatment of severe malaria only.)
- Artesunate/amodiaquine (artesunate + amodiaquine)
- Artesunate/mefloquine (artesunate + mefloquine)
- Artesunate/pyronaridine tetraphosphate (artesunate + pyronaridine tetraphosphate)
- Artesunate + sulfadoxine/pyrimethamine (Co-packaged)
- Chloroquine (Note: For use only for the treatment of Plasmodium vivax infection)
- Dihydroartemisinin/piperaquine phosphate (dihydroartemisinin + piperaquine phosphate)
- Primaquine (Note: For use to reduce the transmission of Plasmodium falciparum and for radical cure of Plasmodium vivax and Plasmodium ovale infections)
- Quinine

===== Medicines for chemoprevention =====
- Amodiaquine + sulfadoxine/pyrimethamine (Co-packaged)
- Sulfadoxine/pyrimethamine (sulfadoxine + pyrimethamine)

===== Medicines for chemoprophylaxis in travellers =====
- Chloroquine (Note: For use only for prophylaxis of Plasmodium vivax infection)
- Doxycycline (Note: > eight years)
- Mefloquine

==== Antipneumocystosis and antitoxoplasmosis medicines ====
- Pyrimethamine
- Sulfadiazine
- Sulfamethoxazole/trimethoprim (sulfamethoxazole + trimethoprim)

==== Antitrypanosomal medicines ====
===== African trypanosomiasis =====
- Fexinidazole (Note: For the treatment of 1st and 2nd stage human African trypanosomiasis due to Trypanosoma brucei gambiense infection)

====== Medicines for the treatment of 1st stage African trypanosomiasis ======
- Pentamidine (Note: To be used for the treatment of Trypanosoma brucei gambiense infection)
- Suramin sodium (Note: To be used for the treatment of the initial phase of Trypanosoma brucei rhodesiense infection)

====== Medicines for the treatment of 2nd stage African trypanosomiasis ======
- Eflornithine
- Nifurtimox (Note: Only to be used in combination with eflornithine, for the treatment of Trypanosoma brucei gambiense infection)

Complementary:

- Melarsoprol^{α}

===== American trypanosomiasis =====
- Benznidazole
- Nifurtimox

=== Medicines for ectoparasitic infections ===
- Ivermectin

=== Medicines for Ebola virus disease ===
- Ansuvimab
- Atoltivimab/maftivimab/odesivimab (atoltivimab + maftivimab + odesivimab)

=== Medicines for COVID-19 ===
No listings in this section.

== Medicines for cystic fibrosis ==
- Elexacaftor/tezacaftor/ivacaftor (elexacaftor + tezacaftor + ivacaftor)
- Ivacaftor

Complementary:

- Pancreatic enzymes^{α}

== Immunomodulators and Antineoplastics ==
=== Immunomodulators for non-malignant disease ===
Complementary:

- Adalimumab^{α} (Note: Etanercept and infliximab are alternatives, including quality-assured biosimilars)
- Azathioprine^{α}
- Ciclosporin^{α}
- Tacrolimus^{α}

=== Antineoplastic and supportive medicines ===
==== Cytotoxic medicines ====
Complementary:

- Arsenic trioxide^{α}
- Asparaginase^{α} (Note: Including quality-assured biosimilars)
- Bleomycin^{α}
- Calcium folinate (leucovorin calcium)^{α}
- Carboplatin^{α}
- Cisplatin^{α}
- Cyclophosphamide^{α}
- Cytarabine^{α}
- Dacarbazine^{α}
- Dactinomycin^{α}
- Daunorubicin^{α}
- Doxorubicin^{α}
- Doxorubicin (as pegylated liposomal)^{α}
- Etoposide^{α}
- Fluorouracil^{α}
- Hydroxyurea (hydroxycarbamide)^{α}
- Ifosfamide^{α}
- Irinotecan^{α}
- Mercaptopurine^{α}
- Methotrexate^{α}
- Oxaliplatin^{α}
- Paclitaxel^{α}
- Pegaspargase^{α}
- Procarbazine^{α}
- Realgar-Indigo naturalis formulation^{α}
- Tioguanine^{α}
- Vinblastine^{α}
- Vincristine^{α}
- Vinorelbine^{α}

==== Targeted therapies ====
Complementary:

- All-trans retinoic acid (tretinoin) (ATRA)^{α}
- Dasatinib^{α}
- Everolimus^{α}
- Imatinib^{α}
- Nilotinib^{α}
- Rituximab^{α}

==== Immunomodulators ====
Complementary:

- Blinatumomab^{α}
- Filgrastim^{α}
- Pegfilgrastim^{α}

==== Hormones and antihormones ====
Complementary:

- Dexamethasone^{α}
- Hydrocortisone^{α}
- Methylprednisolone^{α}
- Prednisolone^{α}

==== Supportive medicines ====
Complementary:

- Allopurinol^{α}
- Mesna^{α}
- Rasburicase^{α}

== Therapeutic foods ==
- Ready-to-use therapeutic food (Note: Biscuit or paste of nutritional composition as determined by the UN joint statement on the community-based management of severe acute malnutrition and Codex alimentarius guidelines)

== Medicines affecting the blood ==
=== Antianaemia medicines ===
- Ferrous salt
- Folic acid
- Hydroxocobalamin

Complementary:

- Erythropoiesis-stimulating agents^{α} (Note: Epoetin alfa, beta and theta; darbepoetin alfa; and their quality-assured biosimilars are alternatives)

=== Medicines affecting coagulation ===
- Desmopressin
- Emicizumab
- Enoxaparin (Note: Alternatives are dalteparin and nadroparin, including their quality-assured biosimilars)
- Phytomenadione

Complementary:

- Heparin sodium^{α}
- Protamine sulfate^{α}
- Warfarin (Note: Acenocoumarol is an alternative)

=== Medicines for haemoglobinopathies ===
==== Medicines for sickle-cell disease ====
- Deferasirox (Note: Deferiprone is an alternative)

Complementary:

- Deferoxamine^{α}
- Hydroxyurea (hydroxycarbamide)^{α}

==== Medicines for thalassaemias ====
- Deferasirox

Complementary:

- Deferoxamine^{α}

== Blood products, coagulation factors and plasma substitutes ==
=== Blood and blood components ===
- Cryoprecipitate, pathogen-reduced (Note: Cryoprecipitate (not pathogen-reduced) is an alternative. Native cryoprecipitate should only be used in situations of life-threatening haemorrhage when pathogen-reduced cryoprecipitate is not available)
- Fresh frozen plasma
- Platelets
- Red blood cells
- Whole blood

==== Human immunoglobulins ====
- Anti-rabies immunoglobulin
- Anti-tetanus immunoglobulin

Complementary:

- Normal immunoglobulin^{α}

=== Coagulation factors ===
- Coagulation factor VIII, plasma-derived
- Coagulation factor IX, plasma-derived
- Coagulation factor VIII, recombinant
- Coagulation factor IX, recombinant

=== Plasma substitutes ===
- Dextran 70 (Note: Polygeline, injectable solution, 3.5% is an alternative)

== Cardiovascular medicines ==
=== Antianginal medicines ===
No listings in this section.

=== Antiarrhythmic medicines ===
No listings in this section.

=== Antihypertensive medicines ===
- Enalapril (Note: Alternatives are 4th level ATC chemical subgroup (C09AA ACE inhibitors, plain))

=== Medicines used in heart failure ===
- Furosemide

Complementary:

- Digoxin^{α}
- Dopamine^{α}

=== Antithrombotic medicines ===
No listings in this section.

=== Lipid-lowering agents ===
No listings in this section.

=== Fixed-dose combinations for prevention of atherosclerotic cardiovascular disease ===
No listings in this section.

== Dermatological medicines ==
=== Antifungal medicines ===
- Miconazole (Note: Alternatives are 4th level ATC chemical subgroup (D01AC Imidazole and triazole derivatives) excluding combinations)
- Selenium sulfide
- Terbinafine

=== Anti-infective medicines ===
- Mupirocin
- Potassium permanganate
- Silver sulfadiazine (Note: > two months)

=== Anti-inflammatory and antipruritic medicines ===
- Betamethasone (Note: Alternatives are 4th level ATC chemical subgroup (D07AC Corticosteroids, potent (group III)))
- Calamine
- Hydrocortisone

=== Medicines affecting skin differentiation and proliferation ===
- Benzoyl peroxide
- Calcipotriol (Note: Calcitriol and tacalcitol are alternatives)
- Coal tar
- Podophyllum resin (Note: Podophyllotoxin is an alternative)
- Salicylic acid
- Urea

Complementary:

- Adalimumab^{α} (Note: Certolizumab pegol, etanercept, and infliximab, including quality-assured biosimilars, are alternatives)
- Methotrexate^{α}
- Ustekinumab^{α}

=== Scabicides and pediculicides ===
- Benzyl benzoate (Note: Precipitated sulfur topical ointment is an alternative)
- Permethrin

=== Moisturizers ===
- Urea
- Glycerol

=== Sunscreens, broad-spectrum ===
- Sunscreen, broad-spectrum

== Diagnostic agents ==
=== Ophthalmic medicines ===
- Fluorescein
- Tropicamide (Note: Atropine and cyclopentolate are alternatives)

=== Radiocontrast media ===
Complementary:

- Barium sulfate^{α}

== Antiseptics and disinfectants ==
=== Antiseptics ===
- Chlorhexidine
- Ethanol (Note: Propanol is an alternative)
- Povidone iodine (Note: Iodine is an alternative)

=== Disinfectants ===
- Alcohol based hand rub
- Chlorine base compound
- Chloroxylenol (Note: Alternatives are 4th level ATC chemical subgroup (D08AE Phenol and derivatives))
- Glutaral
- Hypochlorous acid

== Diuretics ==
- Furosemide

Complementary:

- Hydrochlorothiazide^{α} (Note: Chlorothiazide and chlorthalidone are alternatives)
- Mannitol^{α}
- Spironolactone^{α}

== Gastrointestinal medicines ==
Complementary:

- Pancreatic enzymes^{α}

=== Antiulcer medicines ===
- Omeprazole (Note: Alternatives are 4th level ATC chemical subgroup (A02BC Proton pump inhibitors) excluding combinations)
- Ranitidine (Note: Alternatives are 4th level ATC chemical subgroup (A02BA H2-receptor antagonists) excluding combinations)

=== Antiemetic medicines ===
- Dexamethasone
- Metoclopramide
- Ondansetron

Complementary:

- Aprepitant^{α}

=== Anti-inflammatory medicines ===
No listings in this section.

=== Laxatives ===
No listings in this section.

=== Medicines used in diarrhoea ===
- Oral rehydration salts + zinc sulfate (Co-packaged)

==== Oral rehydration ====
- Oral rehydration salts

==== Medicines for diarrhoea ====
- Zinc sulfate (Note: In acute diarrhoea zinc sulfate should be used as an adjunct to oral rehydration salts)

== Medicines for endocrine disorders ==
=== Adrenal hormones and synthetic substitutes ===
- Fludrocortisone
- Hydrocortisone
- Prednisolone

=== Androgens ===
No listings in this section.

=== Estrogens ===
No listings in this section.

=== Progestogens ===
No listings in this section.

=== Medicines for diabetes ===
==== Insulins ====
- Insulin (analogue, long-acting) (Note: Insulin glargine, Insulin degludec, and insulin detemir, including quality-assured biosimilars, are alternatives)
- Insulin (analogue, rapid-acting) (Note: Insulin lispro, Insulin aspart, and insulin glulisine, including quality-assured biosimilars, are alternatives)
- Insulin (human, intermediate-acting)
- Insulin (human, short-acting)

==== Hypoglycaemic agents ====
Complementary:

- Metformin^{α}

=== Medicines for hypoglycaemia ===
- Glucagon

Complementary:

- Diazoxide^{α}

=== Thyroid hormones and antithyroid medicines ===
- Levothyroxine

Complementary:

- Iodine + potassium iodide (Lugol's solution)^{α}
- Methimazole^{α} (Note: Carbimazole is an alternative depending on local availability)
- Potassium iodide^{α}
- Propylthiouracil^{α} (Note: For use when alternative first-line treatment is not appropriate or available)

=== Medicines for disorders of the pituitary hormone system ===
No listings in this section.

== Immunologicals ==
=== Diagnostic agents ===
- Tuberculin, purified protein derivative (PPD)

=== Sera, immunoglobulins and monoclonal antibodies ===
- Anti-rabies virus monoclonal antibodies
- Antivenom immunoglobulin (Note: Exact type to be defined locally.)
- Diphtheria antitoxin
- Equine rabies immunoglobulin

=== Vaccines ===
- BCG vaccine
- Cholera vaccine
- Dengue vaccine
- Diphtheria vaccine
- Ebola vaccine
- Haemophilus influenzae type b vaccine
- Hepatitis A vaccine
- Hepatitis B vaccine
- Human papilloma virus (HPV) vaccine
- Influenza vaccine (seasonal)
- Japanese encephalitis vaccine
- Malaria vaccine
- Measles vaccine
- Meningococcal meningitis vaccine
- Mpox vaccine
- Mumps vaccine
- Pertussis vaccine
- Pneumococcal vaccine
- Poliomyelitis vaccine
- Rabies vaccine
- Rotavirus vaccine
- Rubella vaccine
- Tetanus vaccine
- Tick-borne encephalitis vaccine
- Typhoid vaccine
- Varicella vaccine
- Yellow fever vaccine

== Muscle relaxants (peripherally-acting) and cholinesterase inhibitors ==
- Neostigmine
- Suxamethonium
- Vecuronium (Note: Atracurium is an alternative)

Complementary:

- Pyridostigmine^{α}

== Ophthalmological preparations ==
=== Anti-infective agents ===
- Aciclovir
- Azithromycin
- Erythromycin
- Gentamicin (Note: Amikacin, kanamycin, netilmicin, and tobramycin are alternatives)
- Natamycin
- Ofloxacin (Note: Alternatives are 4th level ATC chemical subgroup (S01AE Fluoroquinolones))
- Tetracycline (Note: Chlortetracycline and oxytetracycline are alternatives)

=== Anti-inflammatory agents ===
- Prednisolone

=== Local anaesthetics ===
- Tetracaine (Note: Alternatives are 4th level ATC chemical subgroup (S01HA Local anaesthetics) excluding cocaine and combinations)

=== Miotics and antiglaucoma medicines ===
No listings in this section.

=== Mydriatics ===
- Atropine (Note: Cyclopentolate hydrochloride or homatropine hydrobromide are alternatives only for the EMLc)

Complementary:

- Epinephrine (adrenaline)^{α}

=== Anti-vascular endothelial growth factor (VEGF) preparations ===
No listings in this section.

== Medicines for reproductive health and perinatal care ==
=== Contraceptives ===
No listings in this section.

=== Ovulation inducers ===
No listings in this section.

=== Uterotonics ===
No listings in this section.

=== Medicines for medical abortion ===
No listings in this section.

=== Antioxytocics (tocolytics) ===
No listings in this section.

=== Other medicines administered to the mother ===
No listings in this section.

=== Medicines administered to the neonate ===
- Caffeine citrate
- Chlorhexidine

Complementary:

- Alprostadil (prostaglandin E1)^{α} (Note: dinoprostone (prostaglandin E2) is an alternative)
- Beractant^{α}
- Ibuprofen^{α} (Note: Indometacin is an alternative)
- Poractant alfa^{α}

== Peritoneal dialysis solution ==
Complementary:

- Intraperitoneal dialysis solution (of appropriate composition in accordance with local clinical guidelines.)^{α}

== Medicines for mental and behavioural disorders ==
=== Medicines used in psychotic disorders ===
No listings in this section.

=== Medicines used in mood disorders ===
No listings in this section.

==== Medicines used in depressive disorders ====
No listings in this section.

==== Medicines used in bipolar disorders ====
No listings in this section.

=== Medicines for anxiety disorders ===
No listings in this section.

=== Medicines used for obsessive compulsive disorders ===
No listings in this section.

=== Medicines for disorders due to psychoactive substance use ===
No listings in this section.

==== Medicines for alcohol use disorders ====
No listings in this section.

==== Medicines for nicotine use disorders ====
No listings in this section.

==== Medicines for opioid use disorders ====
No listings in this section.

== Medicines acting on the respiratory tract ==
=== Antiasthmatic medicines ===
- Budesonide (Note: Beclometasone, ciclesonide, fluticasone, and mometasone are alternatives)
- Epinephrine (adrenaline)
- Salbutamol (albuterol) (Note: Terbutaline is an alternative)

== Solutions correcting water, electrolyte and acid-base disturbances ==
=== Oral ===
- Oral rehydration salts
- Potassium chloride

=== Parenteral ===
- Glucose
- Glucose with sodium chloride
- Potassium chloride
- Sodium chloride
- Sodium hydrogen carbonate
- Sodium lactate, compound solution

=== Miscellaneous ===
- Water for injection

== Vitamins and minerals ==
- Ascorbic acid
- Colecalciferol (Note: Ergocalciferol is an alternative)
- Iodine
- Multiple micronutrient powder
- Pyridoxine
- Retinol
- Riboflavin
- Thiamine

Complementary:

- Calcium gluconate^{α}

== Ear, nose and throat medicines ==
- Acetic acid
- Budesonide
- Ciprofloxacin (Note: Ofloxacin is an alternative)
- Xylometazoline

== Medicines for diseases of joints ==
=== Medicines used to treat gout ===
No listings in this section.

=== Disease-modifying anti-rheumatic drugs (DMARDs) ===
Complementary:

- Hydroxychloroquine^{α}
- Methotrexate^{α}

=== Medicines for juvenile joint diseases ===
Complementary:

- Acetylsalicylic acid (aspirin) (Note: For use for rheumatic fever, juvenile arthritis, Kawasaki disease)
- Adalimumab^{α}
- Methotrexate^{α}
- Triamcinolone hexacetonide^{α} (Note: Triamcinolone acetonide is an alternative)

== Dental medicines and preparations ==
- Fluoride
- Glass ionomer cement
- Resin-based composite (low-viscosity) (Note: Of any type for use as dental sealant)
- Resin-based composite (high-viscosity) (Note: Of any type for use as dental filling material)
- Silver diamine fluoride
