= WHO Model List of Essential Medicines =

Formulary by the World Health Organization

The WHO Model List of Essential Medicines (a.k.a. Essential Medicines List or EML), published by the World Health Organization (WHO), contains the medications considered to be most effective and safe to meet the most important needs in a health system. The list is frequently used by countries to help develop their own local lists of essential medicines. As of 2016, more than 155 countries have created national lists of essential medicines based on the World Health Organization's model list. This includes both developed and developing countries.

The list is divided into core items and complementary items. The core items are deemed to be the most cost-effective options for key health problems and are usable with little additional health care resources. The complementary items either require additional infrastructure such as specially trained health care providers or diagnostic equipment or have a lower benefit–cost ratio. About 25% of items are in the complementary list. Some medications are listed as both core and complementary. While most medications on the list are available as generic products, being under patent does not prevent inclusion.

The first list was published in 1977 and included 208 medications. The WHO updates the list every two years. There are 306 medications in the 14th list in 2005, 410 in the 19th list in 2015, 433 in the 20th list in 2017, 460 in the 21st list in 2019, and 479 in the 22nd list in 2021. Various national lists contain between 334 and 580 medications. The Essential Medicines List (EML) was updated in September 2025 to its 24th edition. The list contains recommendations for 523 medications.

A separate list for children up to twelve years of age, known as the WHO Model List of Essential Medicines for Children (EMLc), was created in 2007, and is in its 10th edition. It was created to make sure that the needs of children were systematically considered such as availability of proper formulations. Everything in the children's list is also included in the main list. The list and notes are based on the 19th to 24th edition of the main list. Therapeutic alternatives with similar clinical performance are listed for some medicines and they may be considered for national essential medicines lists. The 10th Essential Medicines List for Children was updated in September 2025.

Note: An α indicates a medicine is on the complementary list.

== Anaesthetics, preoperative medicines and medical gases ==
=== General anaesthetics and oxygen ===
==== Inhalational medicines ====
- Isoflurane
- Nitrous oxide (Note: Piped nitrous oxide is a major source of atmospheric pollution from healthcare facilities. Point-of-care cylinders are the preferred delivery system over centrally-supplied (piped) delivery systems)
- Oxygen
- Sevoflurane

==== Injectable medicines ====
- Ketamine
- Propofol (Note: Thiopental is an alternative)

=== Local anaesthetics ===
- Bupivacaine
- Lidocaine
- Lidocaine/epinephrine (lidocaine + epinephrine (adrenaline))

Complementary:

- Ephedrine^{α} (Note: For use in spinal anaesthesia during delivery, to prevent hypotension)

=== Preoperative medication and sedation for short-term procedures ===
- Atropine
- Midazolam
- Morphine

=== Medical gases ===
- Oxygen (Note: No more than 30% oxygen should be used to initiate resuscitation of neonates less than or equal to 32 weeks of gestation)

== Medicines for pain and palliative care ==
=== Non-opioids and non-steroidal anti-inflammatory medicines (NSAIMs) ===
A skeletal model of the chemical structure of aspirin

- Acetylsalicylic acid (aspirin)
- Ibuprofen (Note: Not in children less than three months)
- Paracetamol (acetaminophen) (Note: Not recommended for anti‐inflammatory use due to lack of proven benefit to that effect)

=== Opioid analgesics ===
- Codeine
- Fentanyl (Note: For the management of cancer pain)
- Morphine (Note: Hydromorphone and oxycodone are alternatives)

Complementary:

- Methadone^{α} (Note: For the management of cancer pain)

=== Medicines for other common symptoms in palliative care ===
- Amitriptyline
- Cyclizine
- Dexamethasone
- Diazepam
- Docusate sodium
- Fluoxetine
- Haloperidol
- Hyoscine butylbromide
- Hyoscine hydrobromide
- Lactulose
- Loperamide
- Metoclopramide
- Midazolam (Note: May be used for buccal administration when solution for oromucosal administration is not available)
- Ondansetron (Note: Dolasetron, granisetron, palonosetron, and tropisetron are alternatives)
- Senna

== Antiallergics and medicines used in anaphylaxis ==
- Dexamethasone
- Epinephrine (adrenaline)
- Hydrocortisone
- Loratadine (Note: Cetirizine and fexofenadine are alternatives)
- Prednisolone (Note: Prednisone is an alternative)

== Antidotes and other substances used in poisonings ==
=== Non-specific ===
- Charcoal, activated (Note: Alternative formulations of activated charcoal may be used if granules are not available)

=== Specific ===
- Acetylcysteine
- Atropine
- Calcium gluconate
- Methylthioninium chloride (methylene blue)
- Naloxone
- Penicillamine
- Potassium ferric hexacyano-ferrate(II) -2H_{2}O (prussian blue)
- Sodium nitrite
- Sodium thiosulfate

Complementary:

- Deferoxamine^{α}
- Dimercaprol^{α}
- Fomepizole^{α}
- Sodium calcium edetate^{α}
- Succimer^{α}

== Medicines for neurological disorders ==
=== Medicines for central nervous system disorders ===
==== Antiseizure medicines ====
- Carbamazepine
- Diazepam
- Lamotrigine (Note: For use as adjunctive therapy for treatment-resistant partial or generalized seizures)
- Levetiracetam
- Lorazepam (Note: Diazepam (injection) and midazolam (injection) are alternatives)
- Magnesium sulfate (Note: For use in eclampsia and severe pre‐eclampsia and not for other convulsant disorders)
- Midazolam
- Phenobarbital
- Phenytoin (Note: The presence of both 25 mg/5 mL and 30 mg/5 mL strengths on the same market would cause confusion in prescribing and dispensing and should be avoided)
- Valproic acid (sodium valproate) (Note: Valproic acid (sodium valproate) is not recommended in women and girls of childbearing potential owing to the high risk of birth defects and neurodevelopmental disorders in children exposed to valproic acid (sodium valproate) in the womb)

Complementary:

- Ethosuximide^{α}
- Levetiracetam^{α}
- Valproic acid (sodium valproate)^{α}

==== Medicines for multiple sclerosis ====
Complementary:

- Cladribine^{α}
- Glatiramer acetate^{α}
- Rituximab^{α} (Note: Including quality-assured biosimilars)

==== Medicines for parkinsonism ====
- Biperiden (Note: Trihexyphenidyl is an alternative)
- Levodopa/carbidopa (levodopa + carbidopa) (Note: Benserazide is an alternative for carbidopa)

==== Medicines for cerebral palsy ====
- Baclofen

==== Medicines for headache disorders ====
===== Medicines for acute migraine attacks =====
- Acetylsalicylic acid (aspirin)
- Ibuprofen (Note: Naproxen is an alternative)
- Paracetamol (acetaminophen) (Note: The presence of both 120 mg/5 mL and 125 mg/5mL strengths on the same market would cause confusion in prescribing and dispensing and should be avoided)
- Sumatriptan (Note: Eletriptan is an alternative)

===== Medicines for migraine prophylaxis =====
- Propranolol

===== Medicines for cluster headache =====
- Prednisolone
- Sumatriptan
- Verapamil

==== Medicines for central nervous system infections ====
===== Medicines for bacterial central nervous system infections =====
- Amoxicillin
- Ampicillin
- Benzylpenicillin
- Cefotaxime (Note: Third-generation cephalosporin of choice for use in hospitalized neonates)
- Ceftriaxone (Note: Do not administer with calcium and avoid in infants with hyperbilirubinemia) (Note: > 41 weeks corrected gestational age)
- Chloramphenicol (Note: Only for the presumptive treatment of epidemic meningitis in children older than two years)
- Gentamicin

Complementary:

- Meropenem^{α} (Note: > three months)

===== Medicines for viral central nervous system infections =====
- Aciclovir (Note: Oral valaciclovir is an alternative)

=== Medicines for peripheral nervous system disorders ===
==== Medicines for Guillain-Barré syndrome ====
Complementary:

- Normal immunoglobulin^{α}

==== Medicines for myasthenia gravis ====
- Neostigmine

Complementary:

- Pyridostigmine^{α}

== Anti-infective medicines ==
=== Anthelminthics ===
==== Intestinal anthelminthics ====
A skeletal model of the chemical structure of albendazole

- Albendazole
- Ivermectin
- Levamisole
- Mebendazole
- Niclosamide
- Praziquantel
- Pyrantel

==== Antifilarials ====
- Albendazole
- Diethylcarbamazine
- Ivermectin (Note: Moxidectin is an alternative)

==== Antischistosomals and other antinematode medicines ====
- Praziquantel (Note: Arpraziquantel is an alternative)
- Triclabendazole

Complementary:

- Oxamniquine^{α} (Note: Oxamniquine is listed for use when praziquantel treatment fails)

==== Cysticidal medicines ====
Complementary:

- Albendazole^{α}
- Mebendazole^{α}
- Praziquantel^{α}

=== Antibacterials ===
==== Access group antibiotics ====
This group includes antibiotics that have activity against a wide range of commonly encountered susceptible pathogens while also showing lower resistance potential than antibiotics in the other groups.

- Amikacin
- Amoxicillin
- Amoxicillin/clavulanic acid (amoxicillin + clavulanic acid)
- Ampicillin
- Benzathine benzylpenicillin
- Benzylpenicillin
- Cefalexin
- Cefazolin (Note: > one month)
- Chloramphenicol (Note: Only for the presumptive treatment of epidemic meningitis in children older than two years and in adults)
- Clindamycin
- Cloxacillin (Note: Alternatives are 4th level ATC chemical subgroup (J01CF Beta-lactamase resistant penicillins)) (Note: Cloxacillin, dicloxacillin, and flucloxacillin are preferred for oral administration due to better bioavailability)
- Doxycycline (Note: Use in children <8 years only for life-threatening infections when no alternative exists)
- Gentamicin
- Metronidazole
- Nitrofurantoin
- Phenoxymethylpenicillin (penicillin V)
- Procaine benzylpenicillin (Note: Procaine benzylpenicillin is not recommended as first-line treatment for neonatal sepsis except in settings with high neonatal mortality, when given by trained health workers in cases where hospital care is not achievable)
- Spectinomycin
- Sulfamethoxazole/trimethoprim (sulfamethoxazole + trimethoprim)
- Trimethoprim

==== Watch group antibiotics ====
This group includes antibiotic classes that have higher resistance potential and includes most of the highest priority agents among the Critically Important Antimicrobials for Human Medicine and/or antibiotics that are at relatively high risk of selection of bacterial resistance.

- Azithromycin
- Cefixime
- Cefotaxime (Note: Third-generation cephalosporin of choice for use in hospitalized neonates)
- Ceftriaxone
- Cefuroxime
- Ciprofloxacin
- Clarithromycin (Note: Erythromycin is an alternative as second choice treatment for pharyngitis in children (EMLc only)) (Note: For use in combination regimens for eradication of H. pylori in adults)
- Piperacillin/tazobactam (piperacillin + tazobactam)
- Vancomycin (Note: Vancomycin powder for injection may also be used for oral administration)

Complementary:

- Ceftazidime^{α}
- Meropenem^{α} (Note: Imipenem/cilastatin is an alternative for complicated intraabdominal infections and high-risk febrile neutropenia only. Meropenem is the preferred choice for acute bacterial meningitis in neonates)
- Vancomycin^{α}

==== Reserve group antibiotics ====
This group includes antibiotics and antibiotic classes that should be reserved for treatment of confirmed or suspected infections due to multi-drug-resistant organisms. Complementary:

- Cefiderocol^{α}
- Ceftazidime/avibactam (ceftazidime + avibactam)^{α}
- Ceftolozane/tazobactam (ceftolozane + tazobactam)^{α}
- Colistin^{α}
- Fosfomycin^{α}
- Linezolid^{α} (Note: Tedizolid phosphate is an alternative)
- Meropenem/vaborbactam (meropenem + vaborbactam)^{α}
- Plazomicin^{α}
- Polymyxin B^{α}

==== Antileprosy medicines ====
- Clofazimine
- Dapsone
- Rifampicin

==== Antituberculosis medicines ====
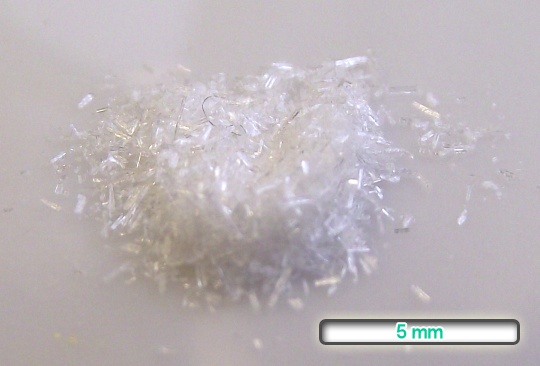
Pure crystals of ethambutol

- Amikacin
- Amoxicillin/clavulanic acid (amoxicillin + clavulanic acid) (Note: For use only in combination with meropenem or imipenem/cilastatin)
- Bedaquiline
- Clofazimine
- Cycloserine (Note: Terizidone is an alternative)
- Delamanid
- Ethambutol
- Ethambutol/isoniazid/pyrazinamide/rifampicin (ethambutol + isoniazid + pyrazinamide + rifampicin)
- Ethambutol/isoniazid/rifampicin (ethambutol + isoniazid + rifampicin)
- Ethionamide (Note: Prothionamide is an alternative for multidrug-resistant tuberculosis)
- Isoniazid
- Isoniazid/pyrazinamide/rifampicin (isoniazid + pyrazinamide + rifampicin)
- Isoniazid/rifampicin (isoniazid + rifampicin)
- Isoniazid/rifapentine (isoniazid + rifapentine)
- Levofloxacin
- Linezolid
- Meropenem (Note: Imipenem/cilastatin is an alternative)
- Moxifloxacin
- P-aminosalicylic acid (p-aminosalicylate sodium)
- Pretomanid
- Pyrazinamide
- Rifabutin
- Rifampicin
- Rifapentine
- Streptomycin

=== Antifungal medicines ===
- Amphotericin B
- Clotrimazole
- Fluconazole
- Flucytosine
- Griseofulvin
- Itraconazole (Note: For treatment of chronic pulmonary aspergillosis, histoplasmosis, sporotrichosis, paracoccidioidomycosis, mycoses caused by T. marneffei and chromoblastomycosis; and prophylaxis of histoplasmosis and infections caused by T. marneffei in AIDS patients)
- Nystatin
- Voriconazole (Note: For treatment of chronic pulmonary aspergillosis and acute invasive aspergillosis)

Complementary:

- Micafungin^{α} (Note: Anidulafungin and caspofungin are alternatives)
- Potassium iodide^{α}

=== Antiviral medicines ===
==== Antiherpes medicines ====
- Aciclovir

==== Antiretrovirals ====
===== Nucleoside/nucleotide reverse transcriptase inhibitors =====
- Abacavir
- Lamivudine
- Tenofovir disoproxil fumarate (Note: Also indicated for pre-exposure prophylaxis)
- Zidovudine

===== Non-nucleoside reverse transcriptase inhibitors =====
- Efavirenz
- Nevirapine (Note: > six weeks)

===== Protease inhibitors =====
- Atazanavir/ritonavir (atazanavir + ritonavir)
- Darunavir (Note: > three years)
- Lopinavir/ritonavir (lopinavir + ritonavir)
- Ritonavir

===== Integrase inhibitors =====
- Dolutegravir (Note: ≥ 4 weeks and ≥ 3 kg; ≥ 25 kg)
- Raltegravir (Note: For use in pregnant women and in second-line regimens in accordance with WHO treatment guidelines)

===== Fixed-dose combinations of antiretroviral medicines =====
- Abacavir/dolutegravir/lamivudine (abacavir + dolutegravir + lamivudine)
- Abacavir/lamivudine (abacavir + lamivudine)
- Dolutegravir/lamivudine/tenofovir (dolutegravir + lamivudine + tenofovir)
- Efavirenz/emtricitabine/tenofovir (Note: Lamivudine is an alternative for emtricitabine)
- Efavirenz/lamivudine/tenofovir (efavirenz + lamivudine + tenofovir)
- Emtricitabine/tenofovir (emtricitabine + tenofovir) (Note: Combination also indicated for pre-exposure prophylaxis)
- Lamivudine/zidovudine (lamivudine + zidovudine)

===== Medicines for prevention of HIV-related opportunistic infections =====
- Isoniazid/pyridoxine/sulfamethoxazole/trimethoprim (isoniazid + pyridoxine + sulfamethoxazole + trimethoprim)

===== Other antivirals =====
- Valganciclovir (Note: For the treatment of cytomegalovirus retinitis (CMVr))

Complementary:

- Oseltamivir^{α} (Note: For severe illness due to confirmed or suspected influenza virus infection in critically ill hospitalized patients)
- Valganciclovir^{α} (Note: For the treatment of cytomegalovirus retinitis (CMVr))

==== Antihepatitis medicines ====
===== Medicines for hepatitis B =====
====== Nucleoside/Nucleotide reverse transcriptase inhibitors ======
- Entecavir
- Tenofovir disoproxil fumarate

===== Medicines for hepatitis C =====
====== Pangenotypic direct-acting antiviral combinations ======
- Daclatasvir (Note: Pangenotypic when used in combination with sofosbuvir)
- Daclatasvir/sofosbuvir (daclatasvir + sofosbuvir)
- Glecaprevir/pibrentasvir (glecaprevir + pibrentasvir)
- Ravidasvir (Note: Pangenotypic when used in combination with sofosbuvir)
- Sofosbuvir (Note: Pangenotypic when used in combination with daclatasvir or ravidasvir)
- Sofosbuvir/velpatasvir (sofosbuvir + velpatasvir)

====== Non-pangenotypic direct-acting antiviral combinations ======
- Ledipasvir/sofosbuvir (ledipasvir + sofosbuvir)

====== Other antivirals for hepatitis C ======
- Ribavirin (Note: For the treatment of hepatitis C, in combination with direct acting anti-viral medicines)

=== Antiprotozoal medicines ===
==== Antiamoebic and antigiardiasis medicines ====
- Diloxanide (Note: Proposed for deletion in 2027)
- Metronidazole (Note: Tinidazole is an alternative)

==== Antileishmaniasis medicines ====
- Amphotericin B (Note: Liposomal amphotericin B has a better safety profile than the sodium deoxycholate formulation and should be prioritized for selection and use depending on local availability and cost)
- Meglumine antimoniate
- Miltefosine
- Paromomycin
- Sodium stibogluconate

==== Antimalarial medicines ====
===== Medicines for curative treatment =====
- Artemether (Note: For use in the management of severe malaria)
- Artemether/lumefantrine (artemether + lumefantrine)
- Artesunate
- Artesunate/amodiaquine (artesunate + amodiaquine)
- Artesunate/mefloquine (artesunate + mefloquine)
- Artesunate/pyronaridine tetraphosphate (artesunate + pyronaridine tetraphosphate)
- Artesunate + sulfadoxine/pyrimethamine (Co-packaged)
- Chloroquine (Note: For use only for the treatment of Plasmodium vivax infection)
- Dihydroartemisinin/piperaquine phosphate (dihydroartemisinin + piperaquine phosphate)
- Primaquine (Note: For use to reduce the transmission of Plasmodium falciparum and for radical cure of Plasmodium vivax and Plasmodium ovale infections)
- Quinine

===== Medicines for chemoprevention =====
- Amodiaquine + sulfadoxine/pyrimethamine (Co-packaged)
- Sulfadoxine/pyrimethamine (sulfadoxine + pyrimethamine)

===== Medicines for chemoprophylaxis in travellers =====
- Chloroquine (Note: For use only for prophylaxis of Plasmodium vivax infection)
- Doxycycline (Note: > 8 years)
- Mefloquine

==== Antipneumocystosis and antitoxoplasmosis medicines ====
- Pyrimethamine
- Sulfadiazine
- Sulfamethoxazole/trimethoprim (sulfamethoxazole + trimethoprim)

Complementary:

- Pentamidine^{α}

==== Antitrypanosomal medicines ====
===== African trypanosomiasis =====
- Fexinidazole (Note: For the treatment of 1st and 2nd stage human African trypanosomiasis due to Trypanosoma brucei gambiense infection)

====== Medicines for the treatment of 1st stage African trypanosomiasis ======
- Pentamidine (Note: To be used for the treatment of Trypanosoma brucei gambiense infection)
- Suramin sodium (Note: To be used for the treatment of the initial phase of Trypanosoma brucei rhodesiense infection)

====== Medicines for the treatment of 2nd stage African trypanosomiasis ======
- Eflornithine
- Melarsoprol
- Nifurtimox (Note: Only to be used in combination with eflornithine, for the treatment of Trypanosoma brucei gambiense infection)

Complementary:

- Melarsoprol^{α}

===== American trypanosomiasis =====
- Benznidazole
- Nifurtimox

=== Medicines for ectoparasitic infections ===
- Ivermectin

=== Medicines for Ebola virus disease ===
- Ansuvimab
- Atoltivimab/maftivimab/odesivimab (atoltivimab + maftivimab + odesivimab)

=== Medicines for COVID-19 ===
No listings in this section.

== Medicines for cystic fibrosis ==
- Elexacaftor/tezacaftor/ivacaftor (elexacaftor + tezacaftor + ivacaftor)
- Ivacaftor

Complementary:

- Pancreatic enzymes^{α}

== Immunomodulators and antineoplastics ==
=== Immunomodulators for non-malignant disease ===
Complementary:

- Adalimumab^{α} (Note: Certolizumab pegol, etanercept, golimumab, and infliximab are alternatives, including quality-assured biosimilars)
- Azathioprine^{α}
- Ciclosporin^{α}
- Tacrolimus^{α}

=== Antineoplastics and supportive medicines ===
==== Cytotoxic medicines ====
Complementary:

- Arsenic trioxide^{α}
- Asparaginase^{α}
- Bendamustine^{α}
- Bleomycin^{α}
- Calcium folinate (leucovorin calcium)^{α}
- Capecitabine^{α}
- Carboplatin^{α}
- Chlorambucil^{α}
- Cisplatin^{α}
- Cyclophosphamide^{α}
- Cytarabine^{α}
- Dacarbazine^{α}
- Dactinomycin^{α}
- Daunorubicin^{α}
- Docetaxel^{α}
- Doxorubicin^{α}
- Doxorubicin (as pegylated liposomal)^{α}
- Etoposide^{α}
- Fludarabine^{α}
- Fluorouracil^{α}
- Gemcitabine^{α}
- Hydroxycarbamide (hydroxyurea)^{α}
- Ifosfamide^{α}
- Irinotecan^{α}
- Melphalan^{α}
- Mercaptopurine^{α}
- Methotrexate^{α}
- Oxaliplatin^{α}
- Paclitaxel^{α}
- Pegaspargase^{α}
- Procarbazine^{α}
- Realgar Indigo naturalis formulation^{α}
- Tioguanine^{α}
- Vinblastine^{α}
- Vincristine^{α}
- Vinorelbine^{α}

==== Targeted therapies ====
Complementary:

- All-trans retinoic acid (tretinoin) (ATRA)^{α}
- Bortezomib^{α}
- Dasatinib^{α}
- Erlotinib^{α} (Note: Afatinib and gefitinib are alternatives)
- Everolimus^{α}
- Ibrutinib^{α} (Note: Zanubrutinib is an alternative)
- Imatinib^{α}
- Nilotinib^{α}
- Rituximab^{α}
- Trastuzumab^{α}

==== Immunomodulators ====
Complementary:

- Blinatumomab^{α}
- Filgrastim^{α}
- Lenalidomide^{α}
- Pegfilgrastim^{α}
- Pembrolizumab^{α} (Note: As monotherapy for deficient mismatch repair (dMMR ) / microsatellite instability-high (MSI-H) tumours)
- Pembrolizumab^{α} (Note: Atezolizumab and cemiplimab are alternatives, including quality-assured biosimilars)
- Pembrolizumab^{α} (Note: Nivolumab is an alternative, including quality-assured biosimilars)
- Thalidomide^{α}

==== Hormones and antihormones ====
Complementary:

- Abiraterone^{α} (Note: Enzalutamide is an alternative)
- Anastrozole^{α} (Note: Alternatives are 4th level ATC chemical subgroup (L02BG Aromatase inhibitors))
- Bicalutamide^{α} (Note: Flutamide and nilutamide are alternatives)
- Dexamethasone^{α}
- Hydrocortisone^{α}
- Leuprorelin^{α} (Note: Goserelin and triptorelin are alternatives)
- Methylprednisolone^{α}
- Prednisolone^{α}
- Tamoxifen^{α}

==== Supportive medicines ====
Complementary:

- Allopurinol^{α}
- Mesna^{α} (Note: May also be used for oral administration)
- Rasburicase^{α}
- Zoledronic acid^{α}

== Therapeutic foods ==
- Ready-to-use therapeutic food (Note: Biscuit or paste of nutritional composition as determined by the UN joint statement on the community-based management of severe acute malnutrition and Codex alimentarius guidelines)

== Medicines affecting the blood ==
=== Antianaemia medicines ===
- Ferrous salt
- Ferrous salt/folic acid (ferrous salt + folic acid)
- Folic acid (Note: Periconceptual use for prevention of first occurrence of neural tube defects)
- Hydroxocobalamin

Complementary:

- Erythropoiesis-stimulating agents^{α} (Note: Epoetin alfa, beta and theta; darbepoetin alfa; methoxy polyethylene glycol-epoetin beta; and their quality-assured biosimilars are alternatives)

=== Medicines affecting coagulation ===
- Dabigatran (Note: Apixaban, edoxaban, and rivaroxaban are alternatives)
- Desmopressin
- Emicizumab
- Enoxaparin (Note: Alternatives are dalteparin and nadroparin, including their quality-assured biosimilars)
- Heparin sodium
- Phytomenadione
- Protamine sulfate
- Tranexamic acid
- Warfarin (Note: Acenocoumarol is an alternative)

Complementary:

- Heparin sodium^{α}
- Protamine sulfate^{α}
- Warfarin^{α}

=== Medicines for haemoglobinopathies ===
==== Medicines for sickle-cell disease ====
- Deferasirox (Note: Deferiprone is an alternative)
- Hydroxyurea (hydroxycarbamide)

Complementary:

- Deferoxamine^{α}

==== Medicines for thalassaemias ====
- Deferasirox

Complementary:

- Deferoxamine^{α}

== Blood products, coagulation factors and plasma substitutes ==
=== Blood and blood components ===
- Cryoprecipitate, pathogen-reduced (Note: Cryoprecipitate (not pathogen-reduced) is an alternative. Native cryoprecipitate should only be used in situations of life-threatening haemorrhage when pathogen-reduced cryoprecipitate is not available)
- Fresh frozen plasma
- Platelets
- Red blood cells
- Whole blood

==== Human immunoglobulins ====
- Anti-D immunoglobulin
- Anti-rabies immunoglobulin
- Anti-tetanus immunoglobulin

Complementary:

- Normal immunoglobulin^{α}

=== Coagulation factors ===
- Coagulation factor VIII, plasma-derived
- Coagulation factor IX, plasma-derived
- Coagulation factor VIII, recombinant
- Coagulation factor IX, recombinant

=== Plasma substitutes ===
- Dextran 70 (Note: Polygeline, injectable solution, 3.5% is an alternative)

== Cardiovascular medicines ==
=== Antianginal medicines ===
- Bisoprolol (Note: Carvedilol and metoprolol are alternatives)
- Glyceryl trinitrate
- Isosorbide dinitrate
- Verapamil

=== Antiarrhythmic medicines ===
- Bisoprolol
- Digoxin
- Epinephrine (adrenaline)
- Lidocaine
- Verapamil

Complementary:

- Amiodarone^{α}

=== Antihypertensive medicines ===
- Amlodipine (Note: Alternatives are 4th level ATC chemical subgroup (C08CA Dihydropyridine derivatives))
- Bisoprolol (Note: Atenolol, carvedilol, and metoprolol are alternatives. Atenolol should not be used as a first-line agent in uncomplicated hypertension in patients > 60 years)
- Enalapril (Note: Alternatives are 4th level ATC chemical subgroup (C09AA ACE inhibitors, plain))
- Hydralazine (Note: Hydralazine is listed for use only in the acute management of severe pregnancy-induced hypertension. Its use in the treatment of essential hypertension is not recommended in view of the evidence of greater efficacy and safety of other medicines)
- Hydrochlorothiazide (Note: Chlorothiazide, chlorthalidone, and indapamide are alternatives)
- Lisinopril/amlodipine (lisinopril + amlodipine) (Note: Alternatives are 4th level ATC chemical subgroup (C09AA ACE inhibitors, plain) (for lisinopril) and 4th level ATC chemical subgroup (C08CA Dihydropyridine derivatives) (for amlodipine))
- Lisinopril/hydrochlorothiazide (lisinopril + hydrochlorothiazide) (Note: Alternatives are 4th level ATC chemical subgroup (C09AA ACE inhibitors, plain) (for lisinopril) and chlorthalidone, chlorothiazide, indapamide (for hydrochlorothiazide))
- Losartan (Note: Alternatives are 4th level ATC chemical subgroup (C09CA Angiotensin II receptor blockers (ARBs), plain))
- Methyldopa (Note: Methyldopa is listed for use only in the management of pregnancy-induced hypertension. Its use in the treatment of essential hypertension is not recommended in view of the evidence of greater efficacy and safety of other medicines)
- Perindopril/amlodipine/indapamide (perindopril + amlodipine + indapamide) (Note: Alternatives are 4th level ATC chemical subgroup (C09AA ACE inhibitors, plain) (for perindopril); and 4th level ATC chemical subgroup (C08CA Dihydropyridine derivatives) (for amlodipine); and chlorthalidone, chlorothiazide, hydrochlorothiazide (for indapamide))
- Telmisartan/amlodipine (telmisartan + amlodipine) (Note: Alternatives are 4th level ATC chemical subgroup (C09CA Angiotensin II receptor blockers (ARBs), plain) (for telmisartan); and 4th level ATC chemical subgroup (C08CA Dihydropyridine derivatives) (for amlodipine))
- Telmisartan/hydrochlorothiazide (telmisartan + hydrochlorothiazide) (Note: Alternatives are 4th level ATC chemical subgroup (C09CA Angiotensin II receptor blockers (ARBs), plain) (for telmisartan); and chlorthalidone, chlorothiazide, indapamide (for hydrochlorothiazide))
- Valsartan/amlodipine/hydrochlorothiazide (valsartan + amlodipine + hydrochlorothiazide) (Note: Alternatives are 4th level ATC chemical subgroup (C09CA Angiotensin II receptor blockers (ARBs), plain) (for valsartan); 4th level ATC chemical subgroup (C08CA Dihydropyridine derivatives) (for amlodipine); and chlorthalidone, chlorothiazide, indapamide (for hydrochlorothiazide))

Complementary:

- Sodium nitroprusside^{α}

=== Medicines used in heart failure ===
- Bisoprolol
- Digoxin
- Enalapril (Note: Alternatives are 4th level ATC chemical subgroup (C09AA ACE inhibitors, plain))
- Furosemide (Note: Bumetanide and torasemide are alternatives)
- Hydrochlorothiazide
- Losartan
- Spironolactone

Complementary:

- Digoxin^{α}
- Dopamine^{α}

=== Antithrombotic medicines ===
==== Anti-platelet medicines ====
- Acetylsalicylic acid (aspirin)
- Clopidogrel

==== Thrombolytic medicines ====
Complementary:

- Alteplase^{α}
- Streptokinase^{α}

=== Lipid-lowering agents ===
- Simvastatin (Note: For use in high‐risk patients. Atorvastatin, fluvastatin, lovastatin, and pravastatin are alternatives)

=== Fixed-dose combinations of various agents for prevention of atherosclerotic cardiovascular disease (also referred to as "polypills") ===
The first patent, Liang MH, Manson JE. (US Patent No. 6,576,256) [“Polypill”]. Treatment of patients at Elevated Cardiovascular Risk with a Combination of a Cholesterol Lowering Agent, an Inhibitor of the Renin-Angiotensin System, and Aspirin, submitted 2001; awarded and assigned to Brigham and Women’s Hospital, 2003.

- Acetylsalicylic acid/atorvastatin/ramipril (acetylsalicylic acid + atorvastatin + ramipril) (Note: Fluvastatin, lovastatin, pravastatin, and simvastatin are alternatives for atorvastatin) (Note: 4th level ATC chemical subgroup (C09AA ACE inhibitors, plain) are alternatives for ramipril)
- Acetylsalicylic acid/simvastatin/ramipril/atenolol/hydrochlorothiazide (acetylsalicylic acid + simvastatin + ramipril + atenolol + hydrochlorothiazide) (Note: Atorvastatin, fluvastatin, lovastatin, and pravastatin are alternatives for simvastatin) (Note: Bisoprolol, carvedilol, and metoprolol are alternatives for atenolol) (Note: Chlorthalidone, chlorothiazide, and indapamide are alternatives for hydrochlorothiazide)
- Atorvastatin/perindopril/amlodipine (atorvastatin + perindopril + amlodipine) (Note: 4th level ATC chemical subgroup (C09AA ACE inhibitors, plain) are alternatives for perindopril) (Note: 4th level ATC chemical subgroup (C08CA Dihydropyridine derivatives) are alternatives for amlodipine)

== Dermatological medicines ==
=== Antifungal medicines ===
- Miconazole (Note: Alternatives are 4th level ATC chemical subgroup (D01AC Imidazole and triazole derivatives) excluding combinations)
- Selenium sulfide
- Sodium thiosulfate
- Terbinafine

=== Anti-infective medicines ===
- Mupirocin
- Potassium permanganate
- Silver sulfadiazine

=== Anti-inflammatory and antipruritic medicines ===
- Betamethasone (Note: Alternatives are 4th level ATC chemical subgroup (D07AC Corticosteroids, potent (group III)))
- Calamine
- Hydrocortisone (Note: Alternatives are 4th level ATC chemical subgroup (D07AA Corticosteroids, weak (group I)))

=== Medicines affecting skin differentiation and proliferation ===
- Benzoyl peroxide
- Calcipotriol (Note: Calcitriol and tacalcitol are alternatives)
- Coal tar
- Fluorouracil
- Podophyllum resin (Note: Podophyllotoxin is an alternative)
- Salicylic acid
- Urea

Complementary:

- Adalimumab^{α} (Note: Certolizumab pegol, etanercept, infliximab, including quality-assured biosimilars, are alternatives)
- Methotrexate^{α}
- Ustekinumab^{α}

=== Scabicides and pediculicides ===
- Benzyl benzoate (Note: Precipitated sulfur topical ointment is an alternative)
- Permethrin

=== Moisturizers ===
- Urea
- Glycerol

=== Sunscreens, broad-spectrum ===
- Sunscreen, broad-spectrum

== Diagnostic agents ==
=== Ophthalmic medicines ===
- Fluorescein
- Tropicamide (Note: Atropine and cyclopentolate are alternatives)

=== Radiocontrast media ===
- Amidotrizoate
- Barium sulfate
- Iohexol

Complementary:

- Barium sulfate^{α}
- Meglumine iotroxate^{α}

== Antiseptics and disinfectants ==
=== Antiseptics ===
- Chlorhexidine
- Ethanol (Note: Propanol is an alternative)
- Povidone iodine (Note: Iodine is an alternative)

=== Disinfectants ===
- Alcohol based hand rub
- Chlorine base compound
- Chloroxylenol (Note: Alternatives are 4th level ATC chemical subgroup (D08AE Phenol and derivatives))
- Glutaral
- Hypochlorous acid

== Diuretics ==
- Amiloride
- Furosemide (Note: Bumetanide and torasemide are alternatives)
- Hydrochlorothiazide
- Mannitol
- Spironolactone

Complementary:

- Hydrochlorothiazide^{α} (Note: Chlorothiazide and chlorthalidone are alternatives)
- Mannitol^{α}
- Spironolactone^{α}

== Gastrointestinal medicines ==
Complementary:

- Pancreatic enzymes^{α}

=== Antiulcer medicines ===
- Omeprazole (Note: Alternatives are 4th level ATC chemical subgroup (A02BC Proton pump inhibitors) excluding combinations)
- Ranitidine (Note: Alternatives are 4th level ATC chemical subgroup (A02BA H2-receptor antagonists) excluding combinations)

=== Antiemetic medicines ===
- Dexamethasone
- Metoclopramide
- Ondansetron

Complementary:

- Aprepitant^{α}

=== Anti-inflammatory medicines ===
- Sulfasalazine (Note: Mesalazine is an alternative)

Complementary:

- Hydrocortisone^{α}
- Prednisolone^{α}

=== Laxatives ===
- Senna (Note: Bisacodyl is an alternative)

=== Medicines used in diarrhea ===
- Oral rehydration salts + zinc sulfate (Co-packaged)

==== Oral rehydration ====
- Oral rehydration salts

==== Medicines for diarrhoea ====
- Zinc sulfate (Note: In acute diarrhoea zinc sulfate should be used as an adjunct to oral rehydration salts)

== Medicines for endocrine disorders ==
=== Adrenal hormones and synthetic substitutes ===
- Fludrocortisone
- Hydrocortisone
- Prednisolone

=== Androgens ===
Complementary:

- Testosterone^{α}

=== Estrogens ===
No listings in this section.

=== Progestogens ===
- Medroxyprogesterone acetate (Note: Norethisterone is an alternative)

=== Medicines for diabetes ===
==== Insulins ====
- Insulin (analogue, long-acting) (Note: Insulin glargine, Insulin degludec, and insulin detemir, including quality-assured biosimilars, are alternatives)
- Insulin (analogue, rapid-acting) (Note: Insulin lispro, Insulin aspart, and insulin glulisine, including quality-assured biosimilars, are alternatives)
- Insulin (human, intermediate-acting)
- Insulin (human, short-acting)

==== Hypoglycaemic agents ====
- Empagliflozin (Note: Canagliflozin and dapagliflozin are alternatives)
- Gliclazide (Note: Glibenclamide not suitable above 60 years. Alternatives are 4th level ATC chemical subgroup (A10BB Sulfonylureas))
- Metformin
- Semaglutide (Note: Dulaglutide, liraglutide, and tirzepatide, including quality-assured biosimilars, are alternatives)

Complementary:

- Metformin^{α}

=== Medicines for hypoglycaemia ===
- Glucagon

Complementary:

- Diazoxide^{α}

=== Thyroid hormones and antithyroid medicines ===
- Levothyroxine
- Potassium iodide
- Methimazole (Note: Carbimazole is an alternative depending on local availability)
- Propylthiouracil (Note: For use when alternative first-line treatment is not appropriate or available; and in patients during the first trimester of pregnancy)

Complementary:

- Iodine + potassium iodide (Lugol's solution)^{α}
- Methimazole^{α}
- Potassium iodide^{α}
- Propylthiouracil^{α} (Note: For use when alternative first-line treatment is not appropriate or available)

=== Medicines for disorders of the pituitary hormone system ===
- Cabergoline (Note: Bromocriptine is an alternative)

Complementary:

- Octreotide^{α}

== Immunologicals ==
=== Diagnostic agents ===
- Tuberculin, purified protein derivative (PPD)

=== Sera, immunoglobulins and monoclonal antibodies ===
- Anti-rabies virus monoclonal antibodies
- Antivenom immunoglobulin (Note: Exact type to be defined locally)
- Diphtheria antitoxin
- Equine rabies immunoglobulin

=== Vaccines ===
- BCG vaccine
- Cholera vaccine
- Dengue vaccine
- Diphtheria vaccine
- Ebola vaccine
- Haemophilus influenzae type b vaccine
- Hepatitis A vaccine
- Hepatitis B vaccine
- Hepatitis E vaccine
- Human papilloma virus (HPV) vaccine
- Influenza vaccine (seasonal)
- Japanese encephalitis vaccine
- Malaria vaccine
- Measles vaccine
- Meningococcal meningitis vaccine
- Mpox vaccine
- Mumps vaccine
- Pertussis vaccine
- Pneumococcal vaccine
- Poliomyelitis vaccine
- Rabies vaccine
- Respiratory syncytial virus vaccine
- Rotavirus vaccine
- Rubella vaccine
- Tetanus vaccine
- Tick-borne encephalitis vaccine
- Typhoid vaccine
- Varicella vaccine
- Yellow fever vaccine

== Muscle relaxants (peripherally-acting) and cholinesterase inhibitors ==
- Atracurium
- Neostigmine
- Suxamethonium
- Vecuronium (Note: Atracurium is an alternative)

Complementary:

- Pyridostigmine^{α}
- Vecuronium^{α}

== Ophthalmological preparations ==
=== Anti-infective agents ===
- Aciclovir
- Azithromycin
- Erythromycin (Note: For infections due to Chlamydia trachomatis or Neisseria gonorrhoeae)
- Gentamicin (Note: Amikacin, kanamycin, netilmicin, and tobramycin are alternatives)
- Natamycin
- Ofloxacin (Note: Alternatives are 4th level ATC chemical subgroup (S01AE Fluoroquinolones))
- Tetracycline (Note: Chlortetracycline and oxytetracycline are alternatives)

=== Anti-inflammatory agents ===
- Prednisolone

=== Local anaesthetics ===
- Tetracaine (Note: Alternatives are 4th level ATC chemical subgroup (S01HA Local anaesthetics) excluding cocaine and combinations)

=== Miotics and antiglaucoma medicines ===
- Acetazolamide
- Latanoprost
- Pilocarpine (Note: Carbachol is an alternative)
- Timolol (Note: Alternatives are 4th level ATC chemical subgroup (S01ED Beta blocking agents) excluding combinations)

=== Mydriatics ===
- Atropine (Note: Cyclopentolate hydrochloride or homatropine hydrobromide are alternatives only for the EMLc)

Complementary:

- Epinephrine (adrenaline)^{α}

=== Anti-vascular endothelial growth factor (VEGF) preparations ===
Complementary:

- Bevacizumab^{α}

== Medicines for reproductive health and perinatal care ==
=== Contraceptives ===
==== Oral hormonal contraceptives ====
- Ethinylestradiol/levonorgestrel (ethinylestradiol + levonorgestrel)
- Ethinylestradiol/norethisterone (ethinylestradiol + norethisterone)
- Levonorgestrel
- Ulipristal

==== Injectable hormonal contraceptives ====
- Estradiol cypionate/medroxyprogesterone acetate (estradiol cypionate + medroxyprogesterone acetate)
- Medroxyprogesterone acetate
- Norethisterone enantate

==== Intrauterine devices ====
- Copper-containing device
- Levonorgestrel-releasing intrauterine system

==== Barrier methods ====
- Condoms
- Diaphragms

==== Implantable contraceptives ====
- Etonogestrel-releasing implant
- Levonorgestrel-releasing implant

==== Intravaginal contraceptives ====
- Ethinylestradiol/etonogestrel (ethinylestradiol + etonogestrel)
- Progesterone vaginal ring (Note: For use in women actively breastfeeding at least 4 times per day)

=== Ovulation inducers ===
Complementary:

- Clomifene^{α}
- Letrozole^{α} (Note: Anastrozole is an alternative)

=== Uterotonics ===
- Carbetocin
- Ergometrine (Note: Methylergometrine is an alternative)
- Misoprostol (Note: Only for use for induction of labour where appropriate facilities are available)
- Oxytocin

=== Medicines for medical abortion ===
- Mifepristone + misoprostol (Co-packaged)
- Misoprostol

=== Antioxytocics (tocolytics) ===
- Nifedipine

=== Other medicines administered to the mother ===
- Dexamethasone
- Multiple micronutrient supplement
- Tranexamic acid

=== Medicines administered to the neonate ===
- Caffeine citrate
- Chlorhexidine

Complementary:

- Alprostadil (prostaglandin E1)^{α} (Note: dinoprostone (prostaglandin E2) is an alternative)
- Beractant^{α}
- Ibuprofen^{α} (Note: Indometacin is an alternative)
- Poractant alfa^{α}

== Peritoneal dialysis solution ==
Complementary:

- Intraperitoneal dialysis solution (of appropriate composition in accordance with local clinical guidelines.)^{α}

== Medicines for mental and behavioural disorders ==
=== Medicines used in psychotic disorders ===
- Fluphenazine (Note: Haloperidol decanonate and zuclopenthixol decanonate are alternatives)
- Haloperidol (Note: Chlorpromazine is an alternative for the tablet)
- Olanzapine
- Paliperidone (Note: Risperidone injection is an alternative)
- Risperidone (Note: Aripiprazole, olanzapine, paliperidone, and quetiapine are alternatives)

Complementary:

- Clozapine^{α}

=== Medicines used in mood disorders ===
==== Medicines used in depressive disorders ====
- Amitriptyline
- Fluoxetine (Note: Citalopram, escitalopram, fluvoxamine, paroxetine, and sertraline are alternatives)

==== Medicines used in bipolar disorders ====
- Carbamazepine
- Lithium carbonate
- Quetiapine (Note: Aripiprazole, olanzapine, and paliperidone are alternatives)
- Valproic acid (sodium valproate)

=== Medicines for anxiety disorders ===
- Diazepam (Note: Lorazepam is an alternative) (Note: For short-term emergency management of acute and severe anxiety symptoms only)
- Fluoxetine

=== Medicines used for obsessive compulsive disorders ===
- Clomipramine
- Fluoxetine

=== Medicines for disorders due to psychoactive substance use ===
==== Medicines for alcohol use disorders ====
- Acamprosate calcium
- Naltrexone

==== Medicines for nicotine use disorders ====
- Bupropion
- Cytisine (cytisinicline)
- Nicotine replacement therapy (NRT)
- Varenicline

==== Medicines for opioid use disorders ====
Complementary:

- Methadone^{α} (Note: Buprenorphine is an alternative. The medicines should only be used within an established support programme)

== Medicines acting on the respiratory tract ==
=== Antiasthmatic medicines and medicines for chronic obstructive pulmonary disease ===
- Budesonide (Note: Beclometasone, ciclesonide, flunisolide, fluticasone, and mometasone are alternatives)
- Budesonide/formoterol (budesonide + formoterol) (Note: Beclometasone/formoterol, budesonide/salmeterol, fluticasone/formoterol, fluticasone furoate/vilanterol, and mometasone/formoterol are alternatives)
- Epinephrine (adrenaline)
- Ipratropium bromide
- Salbutamol (Note: Terbutaline is an alternative)
- Tiotropium (Note: Aclidinium, glycopyrronium, and umeclidinium are alternatives)

== Solutions correcting water, electrolyte and acid-base disturbances ==
=== Oral ===
- Oral rehydration salts
- Potassium chloride

=== Parenteral ===
- Glucose
- Glucose with sodium chloride
- Potassium chloride
- Sodium chloride
- Sodium hydrogen carbonate
- Sodium lactate, compound solution (Ringer's lactate solution)

=== Miscellaneous ===
- Water for injection

== Vitamins and minerals ==
- Ascorbic acid
- Calcium
- Cholecalciferol (Note: Ergocalciferol is an alternative)
- Ergocalciferol (Note: Colecalciferol is an alternative)
- Iodine
- Multiple micronutrient powder
- Nicotinamide
- Pyridoxine
- Retinol
- Riboflavin
- Thiamine

Complementary:

- Calcium gluconate^{α}

== Ear, nose and throat medicines ==
- Acetic acid
- Budesonide
- Ciprofloxacin (Note: Ofloxacin is an alternative)
- Xylometazoline

== Medicines for diseases of joints ==
=== Medicines used to treat gout ===
- Allopurinol

=== Disease-modifying anti-rheumatic drugs (DMARDs) ===
- Chloroquine

Complementary:

- Azathioprine^{α}
- Hydroxychloroquine^{α}
- Methotrexate^{α}
- Penicillamine^{α}
- Sulfasalazine^{α}

=== Medicines for juvenile joint diseases ===
Complementary:

- Acetylsalicylic acid (aspirin) (Note: For use for rheumatic fever, juvenile arthritis, Kawasaki disease)
- Adalimumab^{α}
- Methotrexate^{α}
- Triamcinolone hexacetonide^{α} (Note: Triamcinolone acetonide is an alternative)

== Dental medicines and preparations ==
- Fluoride
- Glass ionomer cement
- Resin-based composite (low-viscosity) (Note: Of any type for use as dental sealant)
- Resin-based composite (high-viscosity) (Note: Of any type for use as dental filling material)
- Silver diamine fluoride

== Notes ==
An α indicates the medicine is on the complementary list for which specialized diagnostic or monitoring or training is needed. An item may also be listed as complementary on the basis of higher costs or a less attractive cost-benefit ratio.
