= Ravidasvir =

Chemical compound

Clinical data
- Other names: PPI-668
- ATC code: J05AP13 (WHO)

Identifiers
- IUPAC name: (2S)-2-{[Hydroxy(methoxy)methylidene]amino}-1-[(2S)-2-[5-(6-{2-[(2S)-1-[(2S)-2-{[hydroxy(methoxy)methylidene]amino}-3-methylbutanoyl]pyrrolidin-2-yl]-1H-1,3-benzodiazol-6-yl}naphthalen-2-yl)-1H-imidazol-2-yl]pyrrolidin-1-yl]-3-methylbutan-1-one
- CAS Number: 1242087-93-9
- PubChem CID: 52918888
- ChemSpider: 31141686
- UNII: AL3G001BI8
- KEGG: D12744
- ChEMBL: ChEMBL3121849
- CompTox Dashboard (EPA): DTXSID401335997

Chemical and physical data
- Formula: C_{42}H_{50}N_{8}O_{6}
- Molar mass: 762.912 g·mol^{−1}
- 3D model (JSmol): Interactive image
- SMILES: CC(C)[C@@H](C(=O)N1CCC[C@H]1C2=NC3=C(N2)C=C(C=C3)C4=CC5=C(C=C4)C=C(C=C5)C6=CN=C(N6)[C@@H]7CCCN7C(=O)[C@H](C(C)C)NC(=O)OC)NC(=O)OC
- InChI: InChI=1S/C42H50N8O6/c1-23(2)35(47-41(53)55-5)39(51)49-17-7-9-33(49)37-43-22-32(46-37)29-14-13-25-19-26(11-12-27(25)20-29)28-15-16-30-31(21-28)45-38(44-30)34-10-8-18-50(34)40(52)36(24(3)4)48-42(54)56-6/h11-16,19-24,33-36H,7-10,17-18H2,1-6H3,(H,43,46)(H,44,45)(H,47,53)(H,48,54)/t33-,34-,35-,36-/m0/s1; Key:LCHMHYPWGWYXEL-ZYADHFCISA-N

Ravidasvir (PPI-668) is an investigational NS5A inhibitor (by Pharco Pharmaceuticals) in clinical trials for chronic hepatitis C genotype 4.

It is on the World Health Organization's List of Essential Medicines.

On December 11, 2024 it was approved in Russia under the trade name Konesko for the treatment of chronic hepatitis C in adult patients (only in combination with sofosbuvir). In the pivotal clinical trial STORM-C-1, the majority of patients were infected with HCV genotypes 1 or 3. Data from this study in patients with HCV genotypes 2 and 6 are limited, and data on patients with genotypes 4 or 5 are not available.

Preliminary clinical trial results were announced in Nov 2015. In April 2017, press reports stated that a combination treatment involving ravidasvir and sofosbuvir had achieved a 97% clearup rate against hepatitis C in a clinical trial conducted in Malaysia and Thailand, and 100% in another conducted in Egypt. It has been granted conditional registration by the National Pharmaceutical Regulatory Agency (NPRA) of Malaysia.
