= Epoetin beta =

Recombinant erythropoietin

Clinical data
- Pronunciation: /ɛˈpoʊ.ɪtɪn/
- Trade names: Neorecormon, Betapoietin, others
- AHFS/Drugs.com: International Drug Names
- License data: EU EMA: by INN
- Pregnancy category: AU: B3
- Routes of administration: Intravenous, subcutaneous
- ATC code: B03XA01 (WHO)

Legal status
- Legal status: AU: S4 (Prescription only); EU: Rx-only; In general: ℞ (Prescription only)

Identifiers
- CAS Number: 122312-54-3
- DrugBank: DB00016
- ChemSpider: none
- UNII: 64FS3BFH5W
- KEGG: D03232

Epoetin beta (INN), sold under the brand name Neorecormon among others, is a synthetic, recombinant form of erythropoietin, a protein that promotes the production of red blood cells. It is an erythropoiesis-stimulating agent (ESA) that is used to treat anemia, commonly associated with chronic kidney failure and cancer chemotherapy.

It is on the World Health Organization's List of Essential Medicines.

== Chemistry ==
Epoetin beta is a recombinant form of human erythropoietin which is produced in Chinese hamster ovary cells. It has the same protein sequence as natural human erythropoietin, being composed of 165 amino acids with about 30 KDa molecular weight.

== History ==
Erythropoietin (EPO) is a hormone produced in the kidneys. The existence of this hormone has been known since 1906, when scientists first started isolating it, and since the 1980s, a recombinant version of the hormone has been available for use in medical treatment.

== See also ==
- Epoetin alfa
- Epoetin theta
