= Ferrous salt/folic acid =

Chemical compound

Combination of
- Ferrous salt: mineral
- Folic acid: vitamin

Clinical data
- Trade names: Fefol, Galfer FA, others
- AHFS/Drugs.com: Multum Consumer Information
- ATC code: B03AD (WHO)

Identifiers
- CAS Number: 60473-87-2

Ferrous salt/folic acid is a supplement used to prevent iron deficiency and folic acid deficiency during pregnancy. It can also be used to treat iron deficiency anemia. It is a fixed dose combination of ferrous salt and folic acid. It is taken by mouth.

Side effects may include dark stools, constipation, and abdominal pain. Caution is advised in people with hemochromatosis. Excessive use in children can cause serious problems.

Ferrous salt/folic acid was approved for medical use in the United States as early as 1946. It is on the World Health Organization's List of Essential Medicines. It is not currently commercially available as a combination in the United States.
