= Acetic acid (medical use) =

Medical uses of acetic acid or vinegar

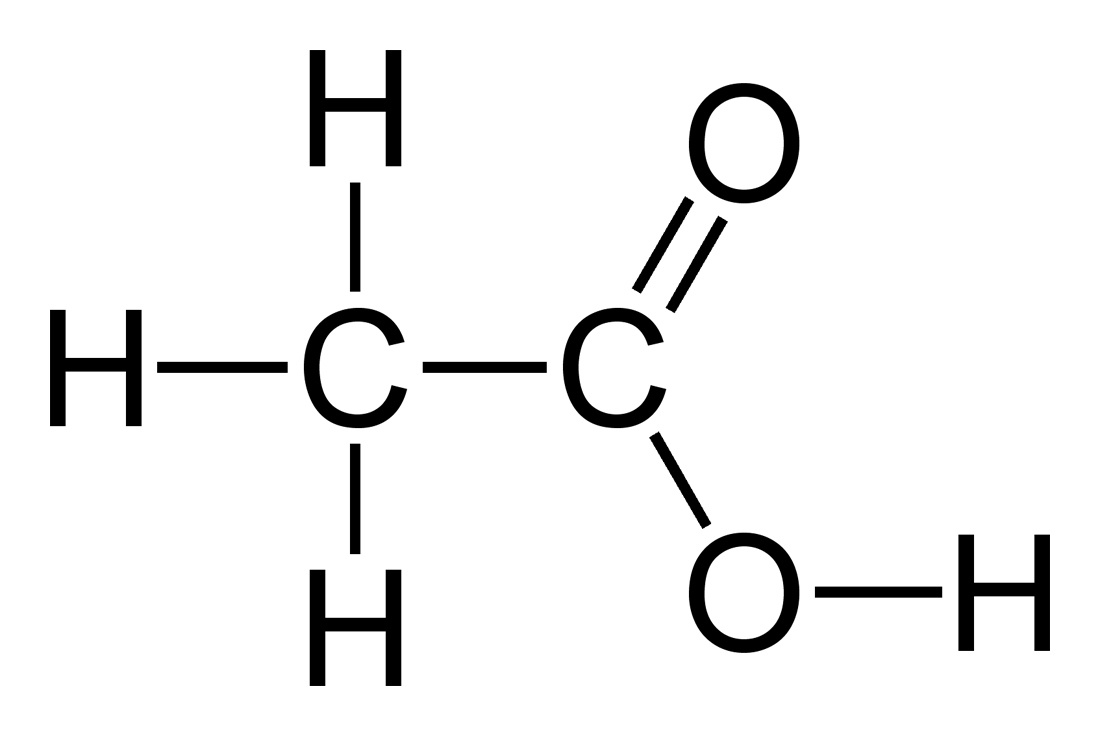
- Chemical formula of acetic acid

Clinical data
- Pronunciation: a-SEE-tik
- Trade names: Acetasol, Vasotate, Domeboro Otic, others
- Other names: Vinegar
- AHFS/Drugs.com: Monograph
- License data: US DailyMed: Acetic_acid
- Routes of administration: ear drops, irrigation, by mouth
- ATC code: S02AA10 (WHO)

Legal status
- Legal status: US: ℞-only / OTC

Identifiers
- IUPAC name: acetic acid
- CAS Number: 64-19-7
- PubChem CID: 176
- DrugBank: DB03166
- ChemSpider: 171
- UNII: Q40Q9N063P
- KEGG: D00010; C00033
- ChEBI: CHEBI:15366
- ChEMBL: ChEMBL539
- PDB ligand: ACY (PDBe, RCSB PDB)

Chemical and physical data
- Formula: C_{2}H_{4}O_{2}
- Molar mass: 60.052 g·mol^{−1}
- 3D model (JSmol): Interactive image
- SMILES: CC(=O)O
- InChI: InChI=1S/C2H4O2/c1-2(3)4/h1H3,(H,3,4); Key:QTBSBXVTEAMEQO-UHFFFAOYSA-N

Acetic acid, which at low concentrations is known as vinegar, is an acid used to treat a number of conditions.

== Definition and medical uses ==
As an eardrop it is used to treat infections of the ear canal. It may be used with an ear wick. As a liquid it is used to flush the bladder in those who have a urinary catheter in an attempt to prevent infection or blockage. As a gel it may be used to adjust the pH of the vagina. It may also be applied to the cervix to help detect cervical cancer during screening.

Side effects may include burning at the site of application. Allergic reactions may rarely occur. Use is not recommended in the ear in people who have a hole in the eardrum. It works against both bacterial and fungal causes of external ear infections.

== History and culture ==
Acetic acid has been used medically since the time of Ancient Egypt. It is on the World Health Organization's List of Essential Medicines. Acetic acid is more commonly used for external ear infections in the developing world than the developed.
