= Potassium permanganate (medical use) =

Medication for some skin conditions

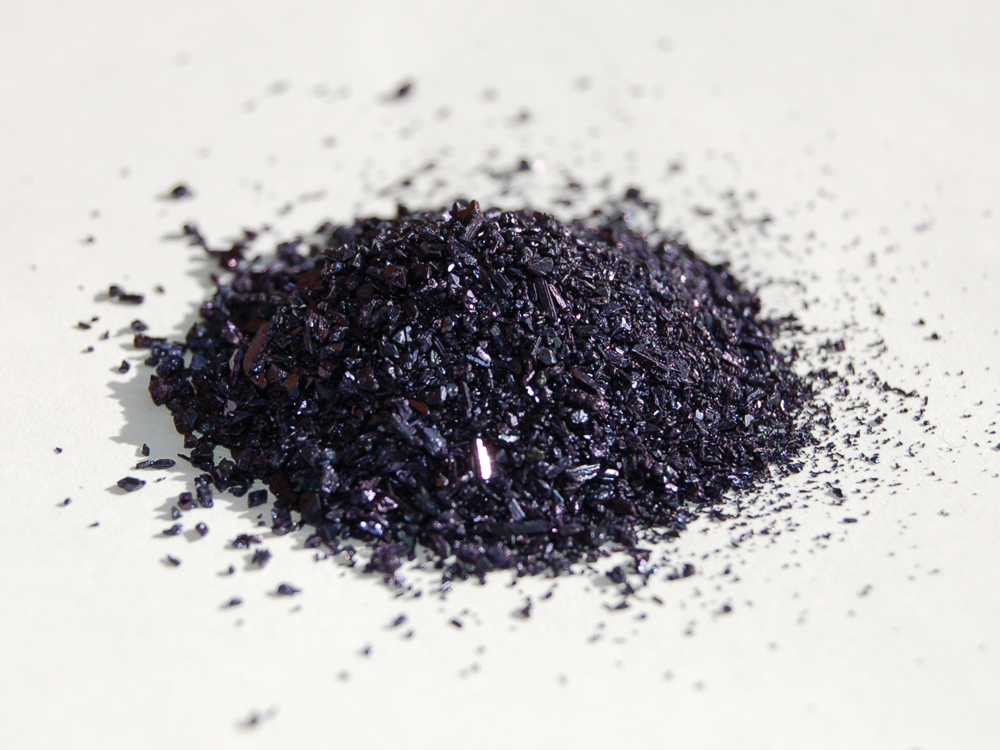

Clinical data
- Trade names: Permitabs, others
- Routes of administration: Topical
- ATC code: D08AX06 (WHO)

Identifiers
- IUPAC name: Potassium manganate(VII)
- CAS Number: 7722-64-7
- PubChem CID: 24400
- ChemSpider: 22810
- UNII: 00OT1QX5U4
- KEGG: D02053

Chemical and physical data
- Formula: KMnO_{4}
- Molar mass: 158.032
- 3D model (JSmol): Interactive image
- SMILES: [O-][Mn](=O)(=O)=O.[K+]
- InChI: InChI=1S/K.Mn.4O/q+1;;;;;-1; Key:VZJVWSHVAAUDKD-UHFFFAOYSA-N

Potassium permanganate is used as a medication for a number of skin conditions. This includes fungal infections of the foot, impetigo, pemphigus, superficial wounds, dermatitis, and tropical ulcers. For tropical ulcers it is used together with procaine benzylpenicillin. It can be applied as a soaked dressing or a bath.

Side effects may include irritation of the skin and discoloration of clothing. If it is taken by mouth, toxicity and death may occur. Potassium permanganate is an oxidizing agent. The British National Formulary recommends that each 100 mg be dissolved in a liter of water before use.

Potassium permanganate was first made in the 1600s and came into common medical use at least as early as the 1800s. It is on the World Health Organization's List of Essential Medicines.

== Medical uses ==
Uses include for fungal infections of the foot, impetigo, pemphigus, superficial wounds, dermatitis (eczema), and tropical ulcers. Typically it is used in skin conditions that produce a lot of liquid. For tropical ulcers it is used together with procaine benzylpenicillin for two to four weeks.

It can be used in children and adults. It can be applied as a soaked dressing or a bath. Petroleum jelly may be used on the nails before soaking to prevent their discoloration. The U.S. Food and Drug Administration does not recommend its use in either the crystal or tablet form.

== Side effects ==
=== Topical ===
Side effects may include irritation of the skin and discoloration of clothing. A harsh burn on a child from an undissolved tablet has been reported. For treating eczema, it is recommended using for a few days at a time due to the possibility of it irritating the skin. Higher concentration solutions can result in chemical burns. Therefore, the British National Formulary recommends 100 mg be dissolved in a liter of water before use to form a 1:10,000 (0.01%) solution. Wrapping the dressings soaked with potassium permanganate is not recommended.

=== By mouth ===
If taken by mouth it is toxic. Side effects may include nausea, vomiting, and shortness of breath may occur. If a sufficiently large amount (about 10 grams) is eaten death may occur.

Concentrated solutions when drunk have resulted in Acute Respiratory Distress Syndrome or swelling of the airway. Recommended measures for those who have ingested potassium permanganate include gastroscopy. Activated charcoal or medications to cause vomiting are not recommended. While medications like ranitidine and N-acetylcysteine may be used in toxicity, evidence for this use is poor.

== Mechanism of action ==
Potassium permanganate functions as an oxidising agent. Through this mechanism it results in disinfection, astringent effects, and decreased smell.

== History ==
Potassium permanganate was first made in the 1600s and came into common medical use at least as early as the 1800s. During World War I Canadian soldiers were given potassium permanganate (to be applied mixed with an ointment) in an effort to prevent sexually transmitted infections (resulting mostly in violet stained genitals.) Some have attempted to bring about an abortion by putting it in the vagina, though this is not effective. Other historical uses have included as an effort to wash out the stomach in those with strychnine or picrotoxin poisoning.

== Society and culture ==
In the United States the FDA requires tablets of the medication to be sold by prescription. Potassium permanganate, however, does not have FDA approved uses and therefore non medical grade potassium permanganate is sometimes used for medical use.

It is available under a number of brand names including Permasol, Koi Med Tricho-Ex, and Kalii permanganas RFF. It is occasionally called "Condy's crystals".

== Other animals ==
Potassium permanganate may be used to prevent the spread of glanders among horses.
