= Triamcinolone hexacetonide =

Chemical compound

Clinical data
- Trade names: Aristospan
- Other names: Triamcinolone acetonide 21-tebutate; Triamcinolone acetonide 21-(tert-butylacetate); 9α-Fluoro-11β,16α,17α,21-tetrahydroxypregna-1,4-diene-3,20-dione cyclic 16,17-acetal with acetone, 21-(3,3-dimethylbutyrate); 9α-Fluoro-11β-hydroxy-16α,17α-((1-methylethylidene)bis(oxy))pregna-1,4-diene-3,20-dione 21-(3,3-dimethylbutyrate)
- Drug class: Corticosteroid; Glucocorticoid

Legal status
- Legal status: CA: ℞-only

Identifiers
- IUPAC name: 2-[(4aS,4bR,5S,6aS,6bS,9aR,10aS,10bS)-4b-Fluoro-5-hydroxy-4a,6a,8,8-tetramethyl-2-oxo-2,4a,4b,5,6,6a,9a,10,10a,10b,11,12-dodecahydro-6bH-naphtho[2',1':4,5]indeno[1,2-d][1,3]dioxol-6b-yl]-2-oxoethyl 3,3-dimethylbutanoate
- CAS Number: 5611-51-8
- PubChem CID: 21826
- ChemSpider: 20516
- UNII: I7GT1U99Y9
- ChEBI: CHEBI:9670
- ChEMBL: ChEMBL1200878
- CompTox Dashboard (EPA): DTXSID0048634
- ECHA InfoCard: 100.024.575

Chemical and physical data
- Formula: C_{30}H_{41}FO_{7}
- Molar mass: 532.649 g·mol^{−1}
- 3D model (JSmol): Interactive image
- SMILES: C[C@]12C[C@@H]([C@]3([C@H]([C@@H]1C[C@@H]4[C@]2(OC(O4)(C)C)C(=O)COC(=O)CC(C)(C)C)CCC5=CC(=O)C=C[C@@]53C)F)O
- InChI: InChI=1S/C30H41FO7/c1-25(2,3)15-24(35)36-16-22(34)30-23(37-26(4,5)38-30)13-20-19-9-8-17-12-18(32)10-11-27(17,6)29(19,31)21(33)14-28(20,30)7/h10-12,19-21,23,33H,8-9,13-16H2,1-7H3/t19-,20-,21-,23+,27-,28-,29-,30+/m0/s1; Key:TZIZWYVVGLXXFV-FLRHRWPCSA-N

Triamcinolone hexacetonide (brand name Aristospan; also known as triamcinolone acetonide 21-tebutate) is a synthetic glucocorticoid corticosteroid.

It is on the World Health Organization's List of Essential Medicines.
