= Zinc sulfate (medical use) =

Dietary supplement

- Chemical model

Clinical data
- Pronunciation: zink SUL fate
- Trade names: Solvazinc, Micro-Zn, others
- AHFS/Drugs.com: Professional Drug Facts
- License data: US DailyMed: Zinc_sulfate
- Routes of administration: By mouth, intravenous
- Drug class: Trace element
- ATC code: A12CB01 (WHO) B05XA18 (WHO)

Legal status
- Legal status: US: ℞-only / OTC

Identifiers
- IUPAC name: Zinc sulfate
- CAS Number: 7733-02-0
- PubChem CID: 24424
- DrugBank: DB09322
- ChemSpider: 22833
- UNII: 0J6Z13X3WO
- ChEBI: CHEBI:35176
- ChEMBL: ChEMBL1200929

Chemical and physical data
- Formula: O_{4}SZn
- Molar mass: 161.44 g·mol^{−1}
- 3D model (JSmol): Interactive image
- SMILES: [O-]S(=O)(=O)[O-].[Zn+2]
- InChI: InChI=1S/H2O4S.Zn/c1-5(2,3)4;/h(H2,1,2,3,4);/q;+2/p-2; Key:NWONKYPBYAMBJT-UHFFFAOYSA-L

Zinc sulfate is used medically as a dietary supplement. Specifically it is used to treat zinc deficiency and to prevent the condition in those at high risk. This includes use together with oral rehydration therapy for children who have diarrhea. General use is not recommended. It may be taken by mouth or by injection into a vein.

Side effects may include abdominal pain, vomiting, headache, and feeling tired. While normal doses are deemed safe in pregnancy and breastfeeding, the safety of larger doses is unclear. Greater care should be taken in those with kidney problems. Zinc is an essential mineral in people as well as other animals.

The medical use of zinc sulfate began as early as the 1600s. It is on the World Health Organization's List of Essential Medicines. In the United States, zinc sulfate is available as a generic medication. In the United Kingdom, it is available over the counter.

== Medical uses ==
The use of zinc sulfate supplements together with oral rehydration therapy decreases the number of bowel movements and the time until the diarrhea stops. Its use in this situation is recommended by the World Health Organization.

There is some evidence zinc is effective in reducing hepatic and neurological symptoms of Wilson's disease.

Zinc sulfate is also an important part of parenteral nutrition.

== Misuse ==
During the 1918 flu pandemic in New Zealand, inhalation chambers were set up in towns and cities as a means to boost immunity. The public were encouraged to attend these chambers and inhale a zinc sulfate mist, a process that was said to disinfect the lungs and throat and protect against infection. In reality, the inhalation of hot steam could inflame the nasal tissue, potentially making participants more susceptible to infection.

In towns such as Ashburton, New Zealand for example, in order to be eligible to travel by train, people had to present documentation at the train station proving that they had been through the inhalation chamber.

The inhalation chamber which was set up in the old Dunedin Post Office building was described as follows: "It was a small room, relatively airtight, holding 20 or 30 persons, and the air is impregnated with the vapour of zinc sulphate. Each batch remains in the chamber for 10 minutes, and the persons treated are instructed to breathe through the nose at first, and then through the mouth."
