= Multiple micronutrient powder =

Essential medicine to prevent malnutrition in children

Combination of
- Iron: Dietary mineral
- Zinc: Dietary mineral
- Vitamin A: Vitamin

Multiple micronutrient powder (MNP) is a combination of at least iron, zinc, and vitamin A. It is used to prevent malnutrition in children and during health emergencies. The target age group is generally those 6 month to 5 years of age. It is used by combining with food once a day for one or more months.

While no side effects have been documented, abdominal discomfort may potentially occur. Some versions of the product contain additional micronutrients such as vitamin C and folic acid.

In 2019, it was added to the World Health Organization's List of Essential Medicines. As of 2015, more than 24 million courses of treatment were distributed via UNICEF.

== Medical use ==
Multiple micronutrient powder is used to prevent malnutrition in children and during health emergencies. Its use has been found to decrease the risk of anemia.
