= Isoniazid/pyridoxine/sulfamethoxazole/trimethoprim =

Medication for the prevention of opportunistic infections in HIV/AIDS

Combination of
- Isoniazid: Anti-tuberculosis medication
- Pyridoxine: Vitamin
- Sulfamethoxazole: Antibiotic
- Trimethoprim: Antibiotic

Clinical data
- Routes of administration: By mouth
- ATC code: J04AM08 (WHO)

Isoniazid/pyridoxine/sulfamethoxazole/trimethoprim (INH/B6/CTX) is a fixed-dose combination medication for the prevention of opportunistic infections in HIV/AIDS. It combines isoniazid, pyridoxine, sulfamethoxazole, and trimethoprim. Specifically it is used to prevent tuberculosis, toxoplasmosis, pneumonia, malaria, and isosporiasis. It is taken by mouth.

Side effects may include trouble concentrating, numbness, vomiting, and rash. Serious side effects may include liver problems. Caution may be required in people with G6PD deficiency. While it has not been well studied, use in pregnancy appears to be okay.

It is on the World Health Organization's List of Essential Medicines. While benefits include being able to take less pills, it is unclear if this version changes peoples adherence to treatment. Other studies, however, have found fixed-dose combinations to be useful for this purpose.
