= Nadroparin calcium =

Chemical compound

Clinical data
- Trade names: Fraxiparin(e), Fraxodi, others
- AHFS/Drugs.com: International Drug Names
- Routes of administration: Subcutaneous injection (except for haemodialysis)
- ATC code: B01AB06 (WHO)

Legal status
- Legal status: AU: S4 (Prescription only); CA: ℞-only

Pharmacokinetic data
- Bioavailability: 89% (SC dose)
- Elimination half-life: 3.7 hours (SC dose)
- Excretion: clearance 21.4mL/min (+/- 7)

Identifiers
- IUPAC name: (4S,6R)-6-[(2R,4R)-4,6-dihydroxy-5-(sulfonatoamino)-2-(sulfonatooxymethyl)oxan-3-yl]oxy-3,4-dihydroxy-5-sulfonatooxyoxane-2-carboxylate
- CAS Number: 9005-49-6
- DrugBank: DB08813
- ChemSpider: none
- UNII: 1K5KDI46KZ
- KEGG: D07510
- CompTox Dashboard (EPA): DTXSID20872761
- ECHA InfoCard: 100.029.698

Chemical and physical data
- Molar mass: 4300 g/mol

Nadroparin (trade names Fraxiparin[e], Fraxodi, among others) is an anticoagulant belonging to a class of drugs called low molecular weight heparins (LMWHs). Nadroparin was developed by Sanofi-Synthélabo.

Nadroparin is used in general and orthopedic surgery to prevent thromboembolic disorders (deep vein thrombosis and pulmonary embolism), and as treatment for deep vein thrombosis. It is also used to prevent clotting during hemodialysis, and for treatment of unstable angina and non-Q wave myocardial infarction.

For the treatment and prevention of DVT, the drug is administered as a subcutaneous injection (under the skin), usually around the abdomen. It is on the World Health Organization's List of Essential Medicines.
