= Abacavir/lamivudine =

Combination drug for HIV

Combination of
- Abacavir: Nucleotide analogue reverse transcriptase inhibitor
- Lamivudine: Nucleotide analogue reverse transcriptase inhibitor

Clinical data
- Trade names: Kivexa, Epzicom, others
- AHFS/Drugs.com: Professional Drug Facts
- MedlinePlus: a696011
- Pregnancy category: AU: B3
- Routes of administration: By mouth
- ATC code: J05AR02 (WHO)

Legal status
- Legal status: AU: S4 (Prescription only); CA: ℞-only; UK: POM (Prescription only); US: ℞-only; EU: Rx-only

Identifiers
- CAS Number: 136470-78-5 136470-78-5; 134678-17-4
- PubChem CID: 5273759
- UNII: WR2TIP26VS; 2T8Q726O95
- KEGG: D08775
- NIAID ChemDB: 225604
- CompTox Dashboard (EPA): DTXSID90234433

Abacavir/lamivudine (ABC/3TC), sold under the brand name Kivexa among others, is a fixed-dose combination antiretroviral medication used to treat HIV/AIDS. It contains abacavir and lamivudine. It is generally recommended for use with other antiretrovirals. It is commonly used as part of the preferred treatment in children. It is taken by mouth as a tablet.

Common side effects include trouble sleeping, headache, depression, feeling tired, nausea, rash, and fever. Serious side effects may include high blood lactate levels, allergic reactions, and enlargement of the liver. It is not recommended in people with a specific gene known as HLA-B*5701. Safety in pregnancy has not been well studied but it appears to be okay. Lamivudine and abacavir are both nucleoside reverse transcriptase inhibitors (NRTI).

Abacavir/lamivudine was approved for medical use in the United States in 2004. It is on the World Health Organization's List of Essential Medicines.

== Society and culture ==
=== Names ===
It is marketed as Kivexa in most countries except for the United States, where it is branded as Epzicom.

=== Legal challenges ===
Teva Pharmaceuticals and Lupin Ltd both filed abbreviated new drug applications (ANDAs) relating to the treatments of HIV using various combinations of abacavir, lamivudine and AZT, and challenging various patents. In 2013 the US District Court for the District of Delaware upheld the validity of a patent covering Epzicom and Tizivir. Other matters were subject to appeal or litigation as of 20 November 2014.

== See also ==
- Abacavir/lamivudine/zidovudine, brand name Trizivir
- Abacavir/dolutegravir/lamivudine, brand name Triumeq
