= Isoniazid/rifampicin =

Medication used to treat tuberculosis

Combination of
- Isoniazid: Anti-tuberculosis medication
- Rifampicin: Anti-tuberculosis medication

Clinical data
- Trade names: IsonaRif, Rifamate, others
- ATC code: J04AM02 (WHO)

Identifiers
- CAS Number: 51683-28-4
- KEGG: D11578

Isoniazid/rifampicin, also known as isoniazid/rifampin, is a medication used to treat tuberculosis. It is a fixed dose combination of isoniazid and rifampicin (rifampin). It is used together with other antituberculosis medication. It is taken by mouth.

It is on the World Health Organization's List of Essential Medicines.

== Adverse effects and safety ==
Side effects are those of the underlying medications. Common side effects include poor coordination, poor appetite, nausea, numbness, and feeling tired. More severe side effects include liver problems. Use is generally not recommended in children. It is unclear if use is safe in pregnancy.
