= Caffeine citrate =

Medication

Clinical data
- Trade names: Cafcit, Gencebok, Cafnea, others
- AHFS/Drugs.com: Monograph
- License data: US DailyMed: Caffeine_citrate
- Routes of administration: By mouth, intravenous (IV)
- ATC code: N06BC01 (WHO)

Legal status
- Legal status: AU: Unscheduled; CA: ℞-only; US: ℞-only; EU: Rx-only

Identifiers
- IUPAC name: 1,3,7-trimethylpurine-2,6-dione; 2-hydroxypropane-1,2,3-tricarboxylic acid
- CAS Number: 69-22-7
- PubChem CID: 6241
- ChemSpider: 6005
- UNII: U26EO4675Q
- KEGG: D07603
- ChEMBL: ChEMBL1200569
- CompTox Dashboard (EPA): DTXSID5046938
- ECHA InfoCard: 100.125.472

Chemical and physical data
- Formula: C_{14}H_{18}N_{4}O_{9}
- Molar mass: 386.317 g·mol^{−1}
- 3D model (JSmol): Interactive image
- SMILES: CN1C=NC2=C1C(=O)N(C(=O)N2C)C.C(C(=O)O)C(CC(=O)O)(C(=O)O)O
- InChI: InChI=1S/C8H10N4O2.C6H8O7/c1-10-4-9-6-5(10)7(13)12(3)8(14)11(6)2;7-3(8)1-6(13,5(11)12)2-4(9)10/h4H,1-3H3;13H,1-2H2,(H,7,8)(H,9,10)(H,11,12); Key:RCQXSQPPHJPGOF-UHFFFAOYSA-N

Caffeine citrate, sold under the brand name Cafcit among others, is a medication used to treat a lack of breathing in premature babies. Specifically it is given to babies who are born at less than 35 weeks or weigh less than 2 kilograms (4.4 lb) once other causes are ruled out. It is given by mouth or slow injection into a vein.

Side effects can include problems feeding, increased heart rate, low blood sugar, necrotizing enterocolitis, and kidney problems. Testing blood caffeine levels is occasionally recommended. Although it is often referred to as a citric acid salt of caffeine, as implied by its name, caffeine citrate in fact consists of cocrystals of the two components. Caffeine citrate is in the xanthine family of medication. It works by stimulating the respiratory centers in the brain.

Although caffeine was isolated in 1819, it was not until 1977 that caffeine citrate was first used for treating apnea of prematurity. It is on the World Health Organization's List of Essential Medicines. The intravenous form may also be taken by mouth.

In June 2020, the Committee for Medicinal Products for Human Use (CHMP) of the European Medicines Agency (EMA) recommended the approval of Gencebok. It was approved for use in the European Union in August 2020.

== Medical uses ==
Caffeine citrate is generally the preferred treatment for apnea of prematurity for infants born 28 to 32 weeks or earlier than 28 weeks. It has fewer side effects as compared to theophylline.

Caffeine improves airway function in asthma, increasing forced expiratory volume (FEV1) by 5% to 18%, with this effect lasting for up to four hours.

== Mechanism ==
In method of action, the preparation is identical to that of caffeine base as the citrate counter ion dissociates in water. Doses of caffeine citrate, due to the added weight of the citrate moiety, are understandably higher than with caffeine base, i.e., it takes a larger dose to get the same amount of caffeine. The ratio of therapeutic doses of caffeine base to its citrate salt is typically 1:2. Dosing should therefore be clearly distinguished.

== Manufacture ==
The drug is prepared by combining anhydrous caffeine with citric acid monohydrate and sodium citrate dihydrate. Caffeine citrate cocrystals can take on at least two anhydrous polymorphs.
