= Urea-containing cream =

Dermatologic drug

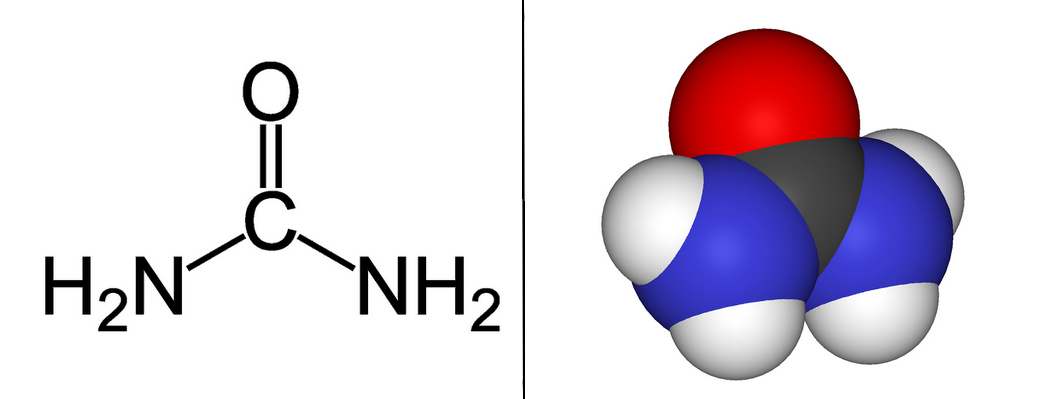
- 2D and 3D image of urea molecule

Clinical data
- Trade names: Decubal, Carmol 40, Keralac, others
- AHFS/Drugs.com: Multum Consumer Information
- License data: US DailyMed: Urea cream
- Routes of administration: Topical
- ATC code: D02AE01 (WHO)

Legal status
- Legal status: US: OTC

Identifiers
- CAS Number: 57-13-6
- ChemSpider: none
- UNII: 8W8T17847W

Urea-containing cream, also known as carbamide-containing cream, is used as a medication and applied to the skin to treat dryness and itching such as may occur in psoriasis, dermatitis, or ichthyosis. It may also be used to soften nails.

In adults side effects are generally few. It may occasionally cause skin irritation. Urea works in part by loosening dried skin. Preparations generally contain 5 to 50% urea.

Urea containing creams have been used since the 1940s. It is on the World Health Organization's List of Essential Medicines. It is available over the counter.

== Medical uses ==
Urea cream is indicated for debridement and promotion of normal healing of skin areas with hyperkeratosis, particularly where healing is inhibited by local skin infection, skin necrosis, fibrinous or itching debris or eschar. Specific condition with hyperkeratosis where urea cream is useful include:

- Dry skin and rough skin
- Dermatitis
- Psoriasis
- Ichthyosis
- Eczema
- Keratosis
- Keratoderma
- Corns
- Calluses
- Damaged, ingrown and devitalized nails

== Side effects ==
Common side effects of urea cream are:

- Mild skin irritation
- Temporary burning sensation
- Stinging sensation
- Itching

In severe cases, there can be an allergic reaction with symptoms such as skin rash, urticaria, difficulty breathing and swelling of the mouth, face, lips, or tongue.

== Mechanism of action ==
Urea in low doses is a humectant while at high doses (above 20%) it causes breakdown of protein in the skin.

Urea dissolves the intercellular matrix of the cells of the stratum corneum, promoting desquamation of scaly skin, eventually resulting in softening of hyperkeratotic areas. In nails, urea causes softening and eventually debridement of the nail plate.
