= Dextran 70 =

Clinical data
- Trade names: RescueFlow, others
- AHFS/Drugs.com: Monograph
- Routes of administration: intravenous
- ATC code: B05AA05 (WHO)

Legal status
- Legal status: US: ℞-only

Identifiers
- CAS Number: 9004-54-0
- DrugBank: DB09255
- UNII: 7SA290YK68

Chemical and physical data
- Molar mass: 70000 Da

Dextran 70 is a polymer of glucose produced by bacteria. It is used by injection into a vein to expand blood volume. Specifically it is used for shock such as that caused by bleeding or burns when blood transfusions are not quickly available. However, it does not carry oxygen. It also slows the clotting of blood when injected. It is also used as an eye lubricant and as a carrier for intravenous technetium.

Common side effects include vomiting, fever, and joint pains. Other side effects include allergic reactions and poor blood clotting. It is not recommended in people with kidney failure, significant heart failure, or a clotting disorder. It is not recommended during pregnancy. It works by pulling fluid from the extravascular space into the blood vessels.

Dextran 70 was approved for medical use in 1947. It is on the World Health Organization's List of Essential Medicines. It comes in either sodium chloride solution or glucose solution.

== Chemical identity ==
Dextrans are glucose polymers with alpha 1-6 linkage produced by bacteria. Dextran 70 refers to the specific version having an average molecular mass of 70,000.

== Adverse effects ==
When injected by excessive amounts, dextran damages the kidney by making the blood too viscous. Dextran accumulates in and is metabolized by hepatocytes; a dose too high can lead to oxidative stress in these cells manifesting as liver damage. Keeping a log of the amount given and monitoring kidney and liver function is recommended. Some people are allergic to dextran.
