= Sofosbuvir/daclatasvir =

Combination drug

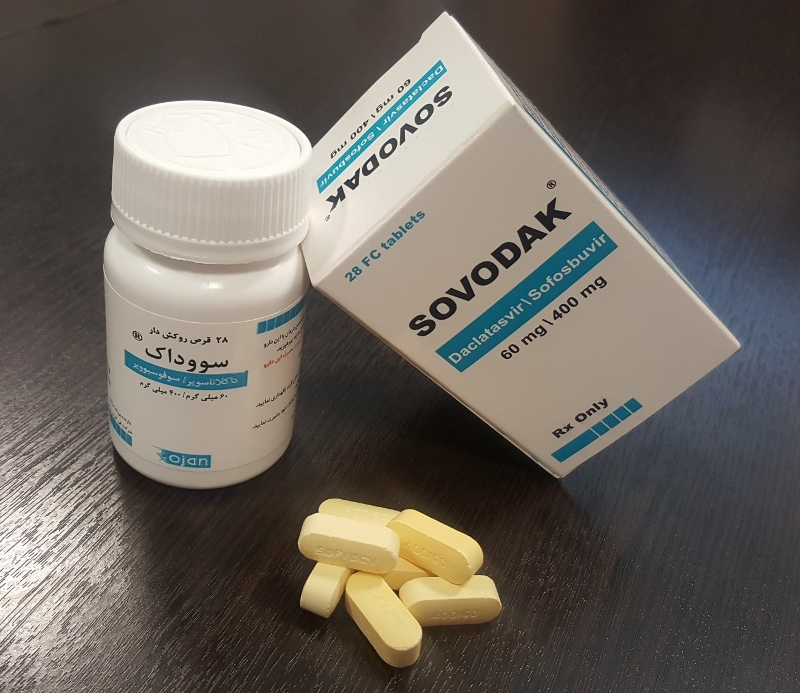
- Sovodak 60/400

Combination of
- Daclatasvir: NS5A inhibitor
- Sofosbuvir: NS5B (RNA polymerase) inhibitor

Clinical data
- Trade names: Darvoni, Sovodak
- Routes of administration: Oral

Identifiers
- CAS Number: 2306918-02-3

Daclatasvir/sofosbuvir (trade names Darvoni, Sovodak) is a two-drug combination for the treatment of hepatitis C. It is given as a single daily pill containing daclatasvir, a viral NS5A inhibitor, and sofosbuvir, a nucleotide inhibitor of the viral RNA polymerase NS5B.

It is on the World Health Organization's List of Essential Medicines.

== Society and culture ==
This combination is produced by an Iranian company under the trade name of Sovodak. The combination includes 400 mg sofosbuvir and 60 mg daclatasvir and has been used in clinical trials since 2015. Sovodak was approved by the Iranian Food and Drug Administration in October 2015 and is currently marketed in Iran as the treatment of choice for all genotypes of hepatitis C as recommended by the national Iranian guideline for treating hepatitis C.

== Research ==
The similarities between the hepatitis C and SARS-CoV-2 virus has led some researches to investigate the effectiveness of sofosbuvir/daclatasvir against COVID-19. Three recently published studies have found this combination to be beneficial against COVID-19 although the findings require confirmation by larger studies.

In October 2020, a meta-analysis found a significantly lower risk of all-cause mortality with the drug combination when given to hospitalized patients with COVID-19.
