= Tazobactam =

Chemical compound

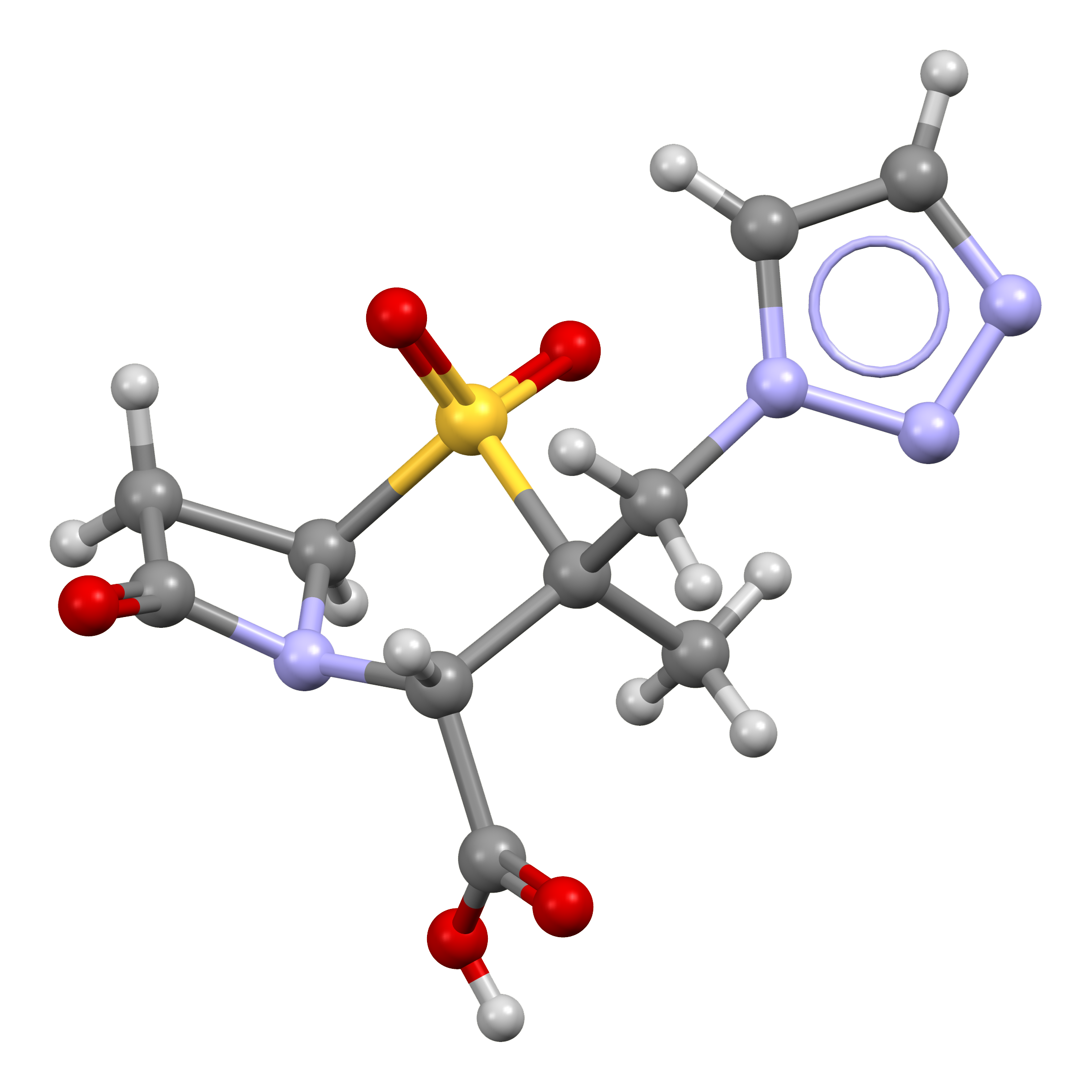

Clinical data
- AHFS/Drugs.com: International Drug Names
- License data: EU EMA: by INN; US DailyMed: Tazobactam
- Pregnancy category: B
- Routes of administration: Intravenous
- ATC code: J01CG02 (WHO)

Legal status
- Legal status: In general: ℞ (Prescription only)

Identifiers
- IUPAC name: (2S,3S,5R)-3-Methyl-7-oxo-3-(1H-1,2,3-triazol-1-ylmethyl)-4-thia-1-azabicyclo[3.2.0]heptane-2-carboxylic acid 4,4-dioxide
- CAS Number: 89786-04-9
- PubChem CID: 123630
- DrugBank: DB01606
- ChemSpider: 110216
- UNII: SE10G96M8W
- KEGG: D00660
- ChEBI: CHEBI:9421
- ChEMBL: ChEMBL404
- CompTox Dashboard (EPA): DTXSID8023634
- ECHA InfoCard: 100.108.321

Chemical and physical data
- Formula: C_{10}H_{12}N_{4}O_{5}S
- Molar mass: 300.29 g·mol^{−1}
- 3D model (JSmol): Interactive image
- SMILES: O=S2(=O)[C@]([C@@H](N1C(=O)C[C@H]12)C(=O)O)(Cn3nncc3)C
- InChI: InChI=1S/C10H12N4O5S/c1-10(5-13-3-2-11-12-13)8(9(16)17)14-6(15)4-7(14)20(10,18)19/h2-3,7-8H,4-5H2,1H3,(H,16,17)/t7-,8+,10+/m1/s1; Key:LPQZKKCYTLCDGQ-WEDXCCLWSA-N

Tazobactam is a pharmaceutical drug that inhibits the action of bacterial β-lactamases, especially those belonging to the SHV-1 and TEM groups. It is commonly used as its sodium salt, tazobactam sodium.

Tazobactam is combined with the extended spectrum β-lactam antibiotic piperacillin in the drug piperacillin/tazobactam, used in infections due to Pseudomonas aeruginosa. Tazobactam broadens the spectrum of piperacillin by making it effective against organisms that express β-lactamase and would normally degrade piperacillin.

Tazobactam was patented in 1982 and came into medical use in 1992.

== See also ==
- Ceftolozane
- Sulbactam
- Clavulanate
