= Epoetin theta =

Clinical data
- Trade names: Biopoin, Eporatio
- ATC code: None

Legal status
- Legal status: EU: Rx-only

Identifiers
- CAS Number: 762263-14-9
- PubChem SID: 135315770
- DrugBank: DB00016
- UNII: 64FS3BFH5W

Chemical and physical data
- Formula: C_{815}H_{1317}N_{233}O_{241}S_{5}
- Molar mass: 18396.19 g·mol^{−1}

Epoetin theta, sold under the brand name Biopoin among others, is a form of the human hormone erythropoietin produced using recombinant DNA technology.

It acts as a short acting erythropoiesis-stimulating agent (ESA) for the treatment of anemia associated with chronic kidney disease and chemotherapy-induced anemia in patients with cancer.

== Medical uses ==
Epoetin theta is indicated for the treatment of symptomatic anemia in adults.

== Side effects ==
The most common side effects include shunt thrombosis (clots that can form in blood vessels of patients on dialysis, a blood clearance technique), headache, hypertension (high blood pressure), hypertensive crisis (sudden, dangerously high blood pressure), skin reactions, arthralgia (joint pain) and influenza (flu)-like illness. Epoetin theta was authorized for medical use in the European Union in October 2009. It is on the World Health Organization's List of Essential Medicines.
