= Haemaccel =

Pharmaceutical solution

Haemaccel (a registered trademark) is a type of intravenous colloid used in the prevention or treatment of shock associated with reduction in effective circulating blood volume due to hemorrhage, loss of plasma (burns, peritonitis, pancreatitis, crush injuries), or loss of water and electrolytes from persistent vomiting and diarrhea. Haemaccel contains degraded gelatin.

It is used as an alternative to human albumin solution (HAS) and starch in supportive treatment of ascites following the procedure of paracentesis.

Polygelin is excreted via the kidneys and has a plasma half-life of three to six hours. This is increased to up to 16 hours in patients with kidney damage. Adverse drug reactions were observed in 0.78% of cases mainly due to histamine release (drop in blood pressure, bronchospasm and skin involvement such as urticaria).

Haemaccel (also marketed as Emagel in Italy, Polygeline in China and Solucel in Venezuela) was originally brought to market by Hoechst AG and later acquired by Piramal Enterprises.
