= List of people from South Shields =

This is a list of notable people who were either born in, or have lived in, the town of South Shields, Tyne & Wear, in the UK. It includes current and historical residents.

== Art and architecture ==
- John Chambers, artist
- Sheila Graber, animator, born South Shields, made an outstanding animation about the river Tyne.
- James Kirkup (1918–2009), poet
- Tish Murtha, documentary photographer born in South Shields, best known for her work documenting marginalised communities, social realism and working class life in Newcastle upon Tyne and The North East England.
- Robert Olley born South Shields, painter of the Westoe Netty
- Alison Smithson, co-founder with husband Peter Smithson of New Brutalism movement in architecture

== Business ==
- John Barbour (1849–1918) clothier, inventor and manufacturer of the Barbour jacket

== Entertainment ==
- Perrie Edwards and Jade Thirlwall from Little Mix.
- Charlie Drummond, a 2009 Big Brother contestant.
- Sir Ridley Scott (born 1937) film director and producer.
- Marnie Simpson, Reality Star.
- Kane Avellano, Guinness World Record for youngest person to circumnavigate the world by motorcycle (solo and unsupported) at the age of 23 in 2017.

=== Acting ===
- Albert Burdon (1900–1981), actor, comedian
- Craig Conway (born 1975), actor starred in Our Friends in the North.
- Ron Cook (born 1948), British television and theatre actor
- Eva Elwes (1876–1950), actor, playwright and manager of Alexandra Theatre, South Shields
- Eric Idle, part of the Monty Python team
- George Irving (born 1954), actor in films and TV. (Anton Meyer in Holby City)
- Lindsay Kemp, dancer, actor, teacher, mime artist and choreographer
- Dale Meeks, actor from Emmerdale (Simon Meredith)
- Leslie Randall (actor)
- Dame Flora Robson (1902–1984), Oscar-nominated actress
- Richard Short (born 1975), actor
- Edward Wilson, television actor (Billy Seaton in 'When the Boat Comes in') and director of the National Youth Theatre 1987–2004.
- John Woodvine (born 1929) RSC actor

=== Broadcasting ===
- Connor Robinson, former UFC Presenter
- Anna Foster English radio news reporter and presenter, currently presenting the early evening programme 5 Live Drive with Tony Livesey on Wednesday to Friday.

=== Comedy ===
- Steve Furst (born 1967), comedian
- Sarah Millican (born 1975), stand-up comedian
- Chris Ramsey (comedian) (born 1986), stand-up comedian, podcaster
- Rosie Ramsey (born 1986), comedian, podcaster

=== Music ===
- Angelic Upstarts, punk band formed in South Shields in 1977.
- Jack Brymer (1915–2003), eminent classical clarinetist
- Lulu James, British soul artist.
- Ernest Farrar (1885–1918), organist, composer
- Ginger (born David Walls, 1964), founding member of The Wildhearts, a hard rock and punk rock band; had success in the mid-'90s
- Alex Kapranos, born in Gloucestershire but was brought up in South Shields, singer in the group Franz Ferdinand
- Barry Lamb, experimental musician, composer was born in South Shields, 1963.
- Claire Rutter, operatic soprano
- Splinter
- Kathy Stobart (born 1936), jazz saxophonist
- Danny McCormack, founding member of The Wildhearts
- Joe McElderry, winner of The X Factor in 2009.
- Jade Thirlwall (born 1992), raised in Laygate, South Shields, part of four-piece girl group Little Mix, winner of the eighth series of X Factor UK.
- Perrie Edwards (born 1993), part of four-piece girl group Little Mix, winner of the eighth series of X Factor UK.

== Military ==
- Richard Wallace Annand (1914–2004), first Victoria Cross recipient of the Second World War
- John Simpson Kirkpatrick (1892–1915), hero of the Gallipoli campaign in WWI.
- Henry Howey Robson (1894–1964), recipient of the Victoria Cross

== Politics ==
- Billy Blyton, Baron Blyton (1899–1987) of South Shields, Labour Party politician
- Edward Cresswell (1876-?), WWI veteran, Labour Party member of the Transvaal Provincial Council in South Africa, trade unionist
- Sir William Fox (1812–1893) four times Prime Minister of New Zealand
- Harold Heslop (1898–1983) trade unionist and writer
- John Erickson (1929–2002), professor of politics at Edinburgh. NATO adviser
- John Gray (born 1948), philosopher, formerly professor of European Thought at the LSE in London.
- Simon Lightwood, MP for Wakefield

== Religion ==
- Oswine of Deira died (651 AD), Northumbrian King and Saint, legend states that he was born at Caer Urfa, site of the excavated Roman fort of Arbeia situated on the Lawe Top.

== Science/medicine ==
- Leo Kinlen, professor of epidemiology at Oxford.
- Ernest Thompson Seton (1860–1946), naturalist, writer and Chief Scout of the Boy Scouts of America
- Thomas Masterman Winterbottom (1766–1859), physician, abolitionist, Surgeon General of the Sierra Leone Company, originator of Winterbottom's sign, and founder of South Tyneside College.

== Sport ==
=== Football ===
- Sam Bartram (1914–1981), goalkeeper for Charlton Athletic 1934-1956
- Phil Brown (born 1959), former footballer, until 15 March 2010 manager of Hull City AFC
- Warney Cresswell, England footballer who played for Sunderland and Everton
- Malcolm Crosby, (born 1954), former professional footballer and manager of Sunderland AFC (1991–1993).
- Tom Curry, former Newcastle United footballer who died in the Munich air disaster
- Stanley Mortensen (1921–1991), international footballer
- Daniel Neil, Sunderland AFC footballer.
- Liam Smith (born 1995), professional footballer.
- Nick Pickering (born 1963), former Sunderland F.C. player, won the FA Cup with Coventry City F.C. in 1987
- Adam Rundle (born 1984), Rotherham United player
- Steve Simonsen (born 1979), footballer
- Martyn Waghorn (born 1990), former Sunderland A.F.C. player, currently plays for Derby County in the championship

=== Other ===
- Chris Cook (born 1979) Olympic and Commonwealth swimmer
- Andrew Stoddart (1864–1915) Captain of England at rugby and cricket
- Sir Frank Williams (1942–2021) Formula One team owner
- David Wilson (born 1985) Rugby Union Player

== Writers ==
- Elinor Brent-Dyer (1894–1969), author of the Chalet School stories
- Robert Colls, professor of English history at the University of Leicester
- Catherine Cookson (1906–1998), novelist
- J. Thomas Looney (1870–1944), Comtean and Shakespeare authorship theorist.
- Barry MacSweeney (1948–2000), poet
- Avro Manhattan (1914–1990), writer
- James Mitchell (1926–2002), TV script writer – Callan, The Avengers, etc.
- Alan Myers (1933–2010), literary translator.
- Dorothy Samuelson-Sandvid, also known as 'Dorfy,' born South Shields, a Geordie dialect writer and author of 'A Basinful O' Geordie'
- Francis Scarfe (1911–1986), poet and critic

== Other ==
- William Downey, with his brother, pioneer photographer; royal photographers to Queen Victoria
- Lauren Luke (born 1981), make-up artist/cosmetics, best known for her YouTube celebrity makeover tutorials.
- Kevin Maguire, award-winning journalist
- Eileen O'Shaughnessy, wife of George Orwell
- Dolly Peel (1782–1857), fishwife, poet and legendary local character.
- George Stout (1860–1944), philosopher
- Lord Wright of Durley (1869–1964), Lord of Appeal
- William Wouldhave (1751–1821), inventor of the first functional lifeboat
