= Small nucleolar RNA TBR4 =

snoTBR4
- Predicted secondary structure and sequence conservation of Small nucleolar RNA TBR4

Identifiers
- Rfam: RF02787

Other data
- Domain: Eukaryota
- GO: GO:0006396,GO:0005730
- SO: SO:0000593
- PDB structures: PDBe

Small nucleolar RNA TBR4 is a non-coding RNA (ncRNA) molecule identified in Trypanosoma brucei which functions in the modification of other small nuclear RNAs (snRNAs). This type of modifying RNA is usually located in the nucleolus of the eukaryotic cell which is a major site of snRNA biogenesis. It is known as a small nucleolar RNA (snoRNA) and also often referred to as a guide RNA.

snoRNA TBR4 belongs to the C/D box class of snoRNAs which contain the conserved sequence motifs known as the C box (UGAUGA) and the D box (CUGA). Most of the members of the box C/D family direct site-specific 2'-O-methylation of substrate RNAs.

TBR4 was one of seventeen snoRNAs identified in Trypanosoma brucei by immunoprecipitation with anti-fibrillarin antibodies. Together with TBR12, TBR6 and TBR2 it is a part of snoRNA gene cluster that is tandemly repeated. These 4 snoRNA genes are transcribed as a polycistronic RNA transcript.

== Other snoRNAs ==
- TBR5
- TBR7
- TBR17
