= C11H16N2O8 =

The molecular formula C_{11}H_{16}N_{2}O_{8} may refer to:

- N-Acetylaspartylglutamic acid
- Base J, or β-D-Glucopyranosyloxymethyluracil
