= Westoe =

Coordinates: 54.9881°N 1.42116947°W

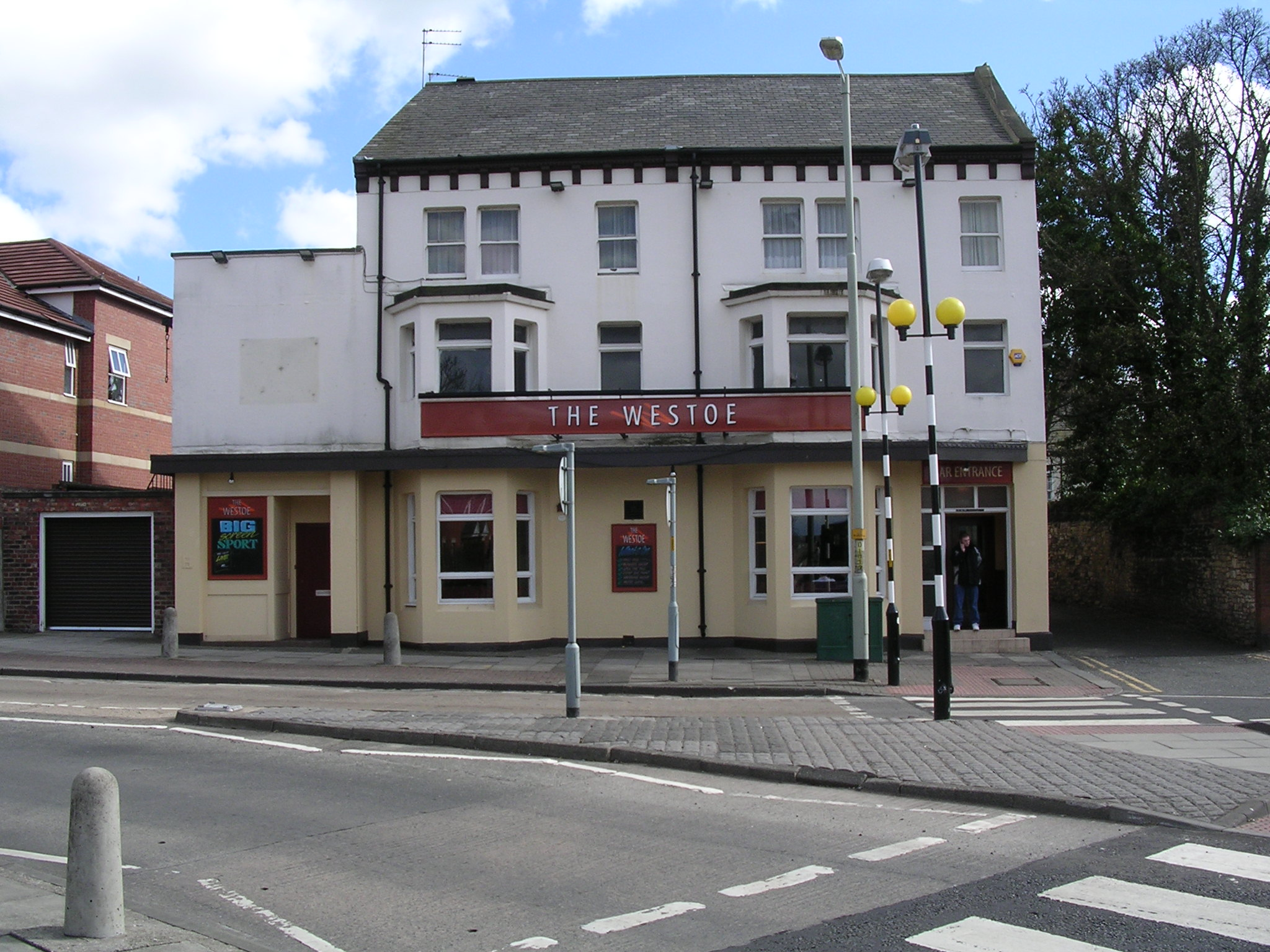
- The Westoe pub, which backs on to Westoe Village

- Location within Tyne and Wear
- OS grid reference: NZ 3713 6609
- Metropolitan borough: South Tyneside
- Metropolitan county: Tyne and Wear
- Region: North East
- Country: England
- Sovereign state: United Kingdom
- Post town: SOUTH SHIELDS
- Postcode district: NE33
- Dialling code: 0191
- Police: Northumbria
- Fire: Tyne and Wear
- Ambulance: North East
- UK Parliament: South Shields

Westoe was originally a village near South Shields, in the South Tyneside district, in Tyne and Wear, England, but has since become part of the town and is now used to refer to the area of the town where the village once was. It is also an electoral ward for local political purposes.

== History ==
=== Westoe Village ===
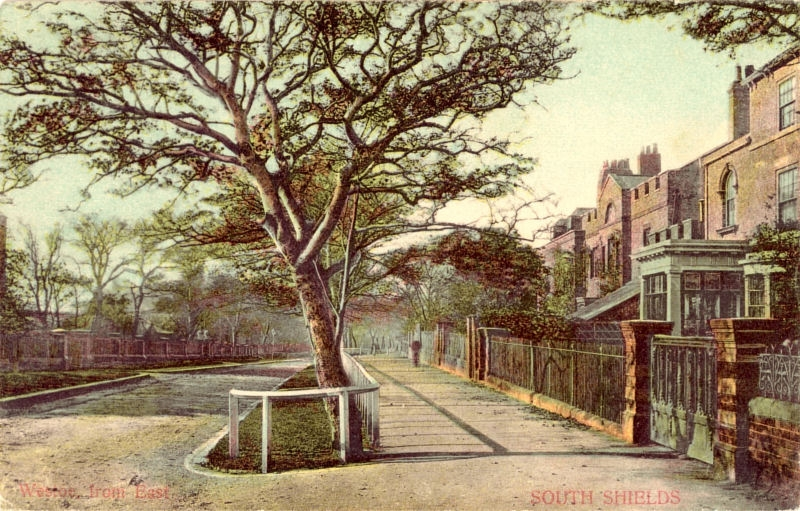
Postcard of Westoe, 1904

The earliest recorded mention of Westoe is in 1072, which refers to a group of seven farms.

In the late 19th and early 20th centuries, the village of Westoe was around one mile south of South Shields (which was then part of County Durham until the formation of Tyne and Wear under the Local Government Act 1972), and was gradually absorbed into the urban sprawl extending from the center of the town.

In contemporary usage, the term "Westoe Village" refers to a specific suburban road of the same name in the Westoe area of the town. It consists of Georgian and Victorian houses, many having been built by business leaders of the town, including those who owned mines and shipyards. It is considered one of the most exclusive areas of South Shields.

Several houses that were historically in the village are not considered to be part of the modern-day Westoe Village. The semi-detached early-nineteenth-century houses of Westoe Terrace have been absorbed into the late Victorian terrace of Dean Road.

=== Westoe Colliery ===
Westoe Colliery was one of many coal mines in the area. Opened in 1909, it operated until May 1993, when it was the last pit of its kind on Tyneside to close. The site of the colliery has since been cleared and redeveloped into Westoe Crown Village, which falls into the Horsley Hill ward of South Tyneside Council.

=== Westoe Cemetery ===
Westoe Cemetery was opened in 1857 and is now closed to new graves (although existing family graves can still be used). Notable local-born physician Dr Thomas Winterbottom, as well as barrister and politician Robert Ingham are buried in the cemetery.

=== The Westoe Netty ===
Westoe became locally famous as the inspiration for a popular painting, Westoe Netty, which illustrates a local public toilet (Netty is a Geordie dialect word for toilet). The original toilet was built in 1890 near a railway bridge on Chichester Road, near its junction with Westoe Road. To allow for regeneration, it was dismantled and put into storage in 1996. In 2008, the toilet was rebuilt as a permanent exhibit at the Beamish Museum.

=== Westoe Brewery ===
Westoe had its brewery, the Westoe Brewery, which stood on Dunelm Street to the off Westoe Road. It was founded by Robert Henderson and construction began in 1885, with the first brewing on 7 April 1886. The brewery continued under the ownership of Robert Henderson until 1907 when Joseph Johnson acquired it, and in 1924 merged it with the City Brewery from Durham. In 1938, the company became Westoe Breweries Limited, and in 1946 became public.

The breweries were taken over by Hammond United Breweries in 1960, and was closed and demolished by 1986.

In 2004, the Jarrow Brewing Company of nearby Jarrow purchased the former Chameleon pub on Claypath Lane, just off Westoe Road, reopening it as The Maltings in May 2005. They expanded their microbrewery output by installing a facility below this pub, producing 100 barrels a week. The company included in its beers Westoe IPA. On 27 September 2018, the company was dissolved.

=== Westoe Fair ===
The annual village fair has musical entertainment, refreshments, and games. A host of charity and voluntary organizations have stalls with tombolas, raffles, and displays including the Rotary Club of South Tyneside and South Shields Local History Group.

== Politics ==
Westoe was formerly a township in the parish of Jarrow, in 1866 Westoe became a separate civil parish, on 30 March 1897 the parish was abolished and merged with South Shields. In 1891 the parish had a population of 72,445.

=== Metropolitan Borough Council ===
Westoe is an electoral ward of South Tyneside Council, and stretches from Chichester Road and Leighton Street in the north, to Harton House Road in the south. In the 2007 local elections the ward returned three independent candidates; however, as of 2018, the ward had returned to three labor councilors. The ward population taken at the 2011 census was 8,080.

=== UK Parliament ===
Westoe is located in the South Shields constituency. Its 2017 electorate was estimated to consist of 6227 voters.

== Transport ==
=== Road ===
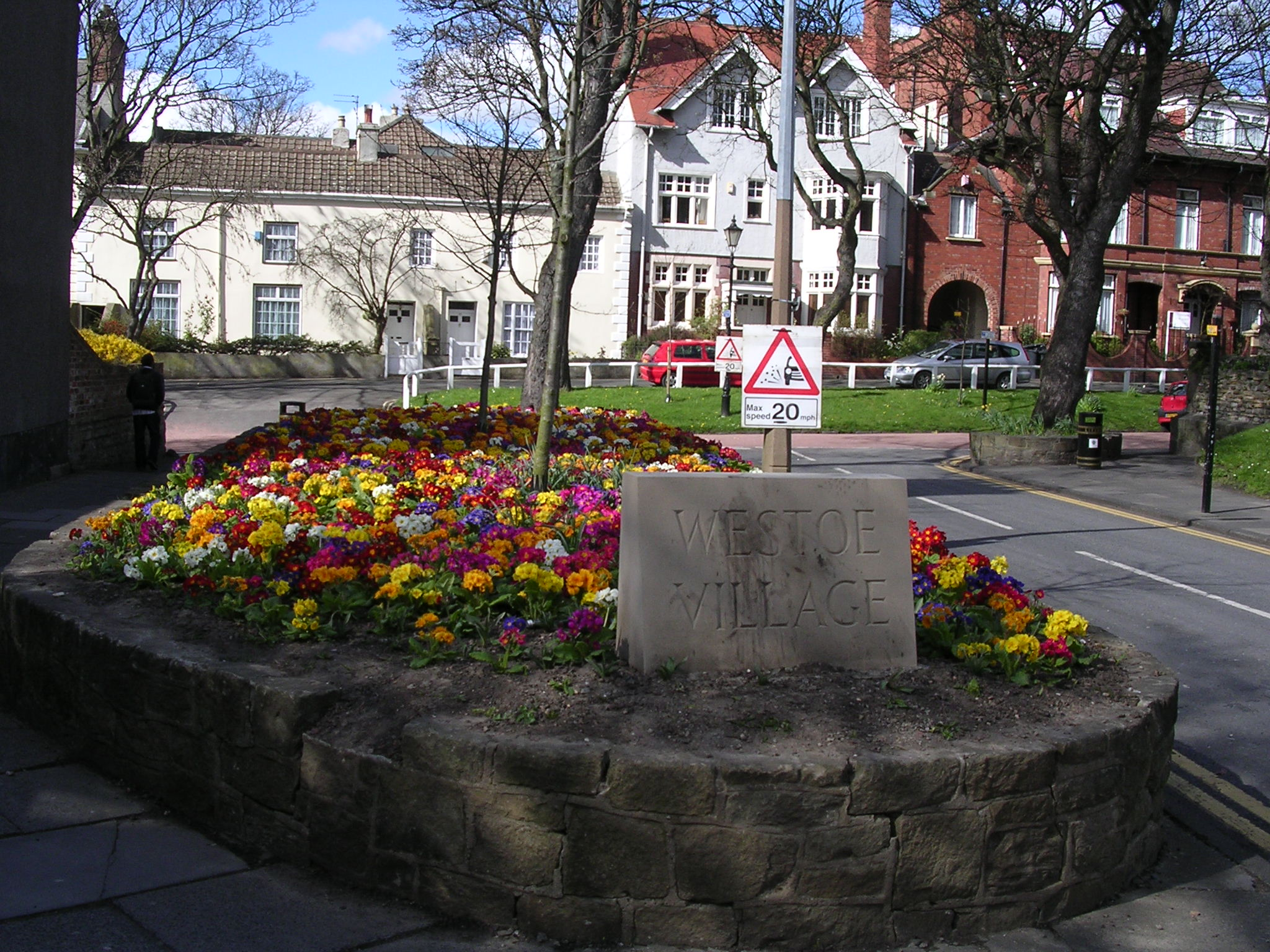
Entrance to Westoe Village, from St George's Avenue

Westoe Road (formerly Westoe Lane) forms part of the A1018 road from South Shields to Seaham, and was so named because it originally ran between South Shields and Westoe Village. What is now considered Westoe Village has limited vehicular access via St George's Avenue only, which contributes heavily to its tranquil reputation.

=== Tyne and Wear Metro ===
The Westoe area is served by the Chichester Metro station, the penultimate stop on the South Shields branch of the Tyne and Wear Metro rapid transit system.

== Education ==
The South Shields campus of South Tyneside College is located on St George's Avenue (just before access to Westoe Village) and serves further education to people ages 14 years and older.

== Sport ==
=== Westoe Rugby Football Club ===
Westoe Rugby Football Club, which was established in 1875, is one of the oldest organizations still in the Westoe area today. The club has continuously occupied its original ground, directly opposite Westoe Village, since its establishment, and is today one of the local community hubs of the area.

=== Harton & Westoe CW ===
Harton and Westoe C.W was a association football club in Westoe, South Shields. The club was playing in the Wearside League before going into extinction in 2019.

== Readhead Park ==
Robert Readhead was a local businessman and was the eldest son of John Readhead, who founded John Readhead and Sons Limited, a noted local shipwright and marine engineering firm. Joining his father's business as an apprentice, Readhead stuck with the firm and eventually became one of the directors, retiring from active involvement in 1909 to take a larger community role - something he continued for the next 40 years (including four years spent as mayor).

In 1921, Readhead donated the land on which Readhead park lies to the town in thanksgiving for peace. The park was opened on 18 May 1923, and features a 3 ft high scroll-style commemorative plaque which reads:

County Borough of South Shields Robert Readhead Park. This park was presented by Alderman Robert Readhead J.P. to the town council of South Shields for public pleasure grounds by deed of gift dated 20th April 1923. Opened to the public on the 3rd May 1923 by Robert Readhead ESQ M.A. (Oxon) (Son of the Donor), Edward Smith, Mayor, John Lawson, Chairman of Parks and Cemeteries committee.

The park has a bowling club (which includes a bowling pavilion), tennis courts, and a small children's play area.

== Notable residents ==
- Elinor Brent-Dyer, author of the Chalet School books; born in South Shields; attended school in Westoe
- Catherine Cookson, author, lived at Tyne Dock, South Shields, and would have visited Westoe, although she was not a resident; it was the backdrop for a number of her romance novels
- William Fox, four time Prime Minister of New Zealand
- Robert Ingham, twice MP for South Shields, lived at Westoe House
- Joe McElderry, winner of The X Factor in 2009, pop/classical crossover singer and model; born and grew up in Westoe and still lives nearby
- Livingston Middlemost, born in Westoe; first-class cricketer
- Dame Flora Robson, actress; nominated for an Oscar for her role in Saratoga Trunk
- Andrew Stoddart, born in Westoe; played international cricket for England and rugby union for England and the British Isles; Wisden Cricketer of the Year in 1893
