= C21H18F3N3O3 =

The molecular formula C_{21}H_{18}F_{3}N_{3}O_{3} may refer to:

- Inaxaplin
- Temafloxacin
