= Inaxaplin =

Chemical compound

Clinical data
- Other names: VX-147

Legal status
- Legal status: Investigational

Identifiers
- IUPAC name: 3-[5,7-Difluoro-2-(4-fluorophenyl)-1H-indol-3-yl]-N-[(3S,4R)-4-hydroxy-2-oxopyrrolidin-3-yl]propanamide
- CAS Number: 2446816-88-0
- PubChem CID: 147289591
- ChemSpider: 115009344
- UNII: S2SJ2RVZ6Y
- KEGG: D12964
- ChEMBL: ChEMBL5083170

Chemical and physical data
- Formula: C_{21}H_{18}F_{3}N_{3}O_{3}
- Molar mass: 417.388 g·mol^{−1}
- 3D model (JSmol): Interactive image
- SMILES: C1[C@H]([C@@H](C(=O)N1)NC(=O)CCC2=C(NC3=C2C=C(C=C3F)F)C4=CC=C(C=C4)F)O
- InChI: InChI=1S/C21H18F3N3O3/c22-11-3-1-10(2-4-11)18-13(14-7-12(23)8-15(24)19(14)27-18)5-6-17(29)26-20-16(28)9-25-21(20)30/h1-4,7-8,16,20,27-28H,5-6,9H2,(H,25,30)(H,26,29)/t16-,20+/m1/s1; Key:CTXLPYZCBOVVQK-UZLBHIALSA-N

Inaxaplin (VX-147) is a small-molecule apolipoprotein L1 inhibitor developed by Vertex Pharmaceuticals for APOL1-mediated kidney disease. In preliminary studies the drug has shown promise in treating people with kidney disease and multiple gain of function mutations on the APOL1 gene.
