= Livingston Middlemost =

English cricketer

Personal information
- Full name: Livingston Middlemost
- Born: 1 April 1839; Westoe, County Durham, England
- Died: 28 October 1897 (aged 58); Huddersfield, Yorkshire, England
- Batting: Unknown

Career statistics
Competition	First-class
Matches	2
Runs scored	21
Batting average	7.00
100s/50s	–/–
Top score	17
Catches/stumpings	1/–
- Source: Cricinfo, 31 March 2019

Livingston Middlemost (1 April 1839 – 28 October 1897) was an English first-class cricketer.

Middlemost was born at Westoe, South Shields. He made his debut in first-class cricket for the North against Surrey at Salford in 1860. Batting once in the match, Middlemost was dismissed for 4 runs in the North's first-innings by H. H. Stephenson. He made a second first-class appearance seventeen years later for the Players of the North against the Gentlemen of the North at Huddersfield. Batting twice in the match, he was dismissed for a duck batting at number eleven in the Player's first-innings by William Mycroft, while in their second-innings he opened the batting, scoring 17 runs before retiring out.

By profession, he was a woollen manufacturer and merchant. A year prior to his death he had travelled to Australia for health reasons. He died suddenly on 28 October 1897 at Huddersfield, having returned from playing golf at Fixby.
