= Haptoglobin-related protein =

Blood protein in primates

HPR

Identifiers
- Aliases: HPR, A-259H10.2, HP
- External IDs: OMIM: 140210; MGI: 96211; GeneCards: HPR

Gene location (Human)
Chr.	Chromosome 16 (human)
Band	16q22.2	Start	72,063,148 bp
Band	16q22.2	End	72,077,246 bp

Gene location (Mouse)
Chr.	Chromosome 8 (mouse)
Band	8 D3|8 57.11 cM	Start	110,301,760 bp
Band	8 D3|8 57.11 cM	End	110,305,804 bp
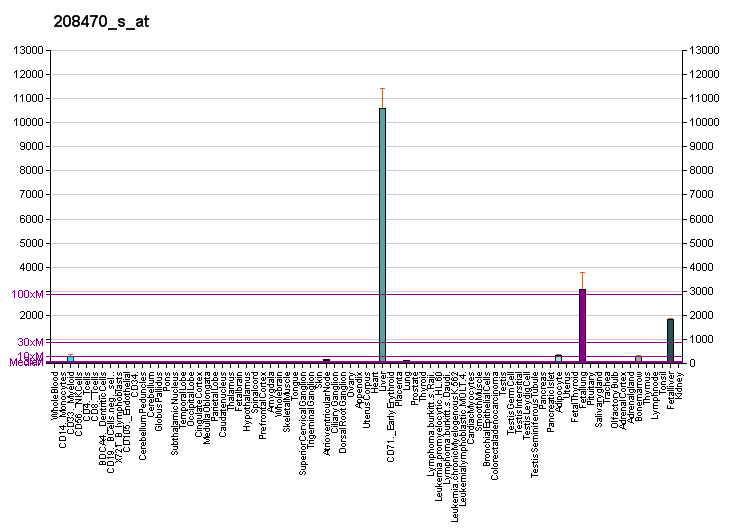

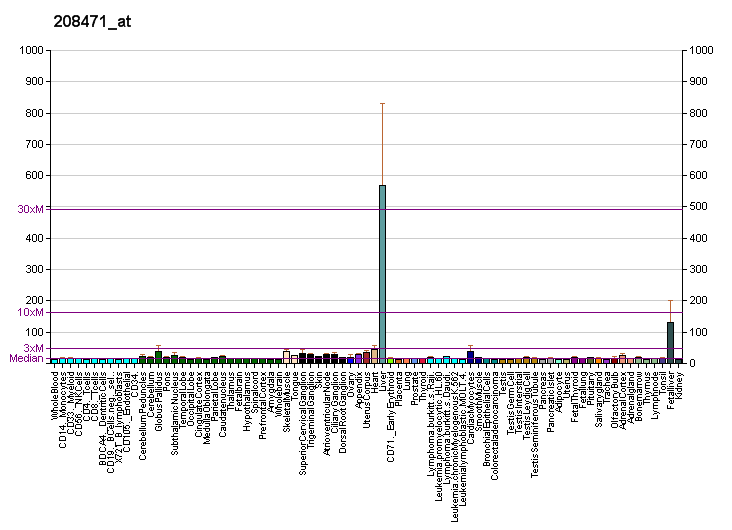
RNA expression pattern
Bgee	Human / Mouse (ortholog); Top expressed in: right lobe of liver; apex of heart; left ventricle; right ventricle; right auricle of heart; myocardium of left ventricle; testicle; putamen; caudate nucleus; tibial nerve / Top expressed in: lacrimal gland; gallbladder; left lobe of liver; granulocyte; right lung lobe; stroma of bone marrow; white adipose tissue; subcutaneous adipose tissue; tunica adventitia of aorta; tibiofemoral joint; More reference expression data
BioGPS	More reference expression data
Gene ontology
Molecular function	hemoglobin binding; serine-type endopeptidase activity
Cellular component	spherical high-density lipoprotein particle; extracellular region; extracellular exosome; blood microparticle; extracellular space
Biological process	receptor-mediated endocytosis; acute inflammatory response; proteolysis; response to organic substance; positive regulation of cell death
Sources:Amigo / QuickGO
Orthologs
Databases	NCBI: entry; OMA: entry
Species	Human	Mouse
Entrez	3250	15439
Ensembl	ENSG00000261701	ENSMUSG00000031722
UniProt	P00739	Q61646
RefSeq (mRNA)	NM_020995; NM_001384360	NM_017370; NM_001329965
RefSeq (protein)	NP_066275	NP_001316894; NP_059066
Location (UCSC)	Chr 16: 72.06 – 72.08 Mb	Chr 8: 110.3 – 110.31 Mb
PubMed search
- Wikidata
View/Edit Human	View/Edit Mouse

Haptoglobin-related protein (Hpr) is a serum protein that binds to haemoglobin of red blood cells and is present only in primates. It acts as a molecule of innate immunity in association with apolipoprotein L1 (ApoL 1)-containing high-density lipoprotein (HDL) particles. In humans, together with related serum protein, haptoglobin, it acts as a cell-killing agent as part of the trypanolytic factor against the protozoan parasite Trypanosoma brucei thereby providing natural resistance to African sleeping sickness. It is produced from the gene HPR that is located on the long arm of chromosome 16 within the HP (for haptoglobin) gene cluster.

== History ==
Haptoglobin was discovered as a "plasma substance" in 1938 by French biochemists Max-Fernand Jayle and Michel Polonovski. The gene (later denoted as HP or Hp) was identified by British biochemist Oliver Smithies and his mentor, Canadian geneticist Norma Ford Walker in 1956. Smithies and Walker discovered that the gene could exist in two allelic autosomal genes, Hp^{1}and Hp^{2}. Additional allele and associated genes were subsequently identified.

In 1983, Italian geneticist Riccardo Cortese and his team, led by Giovanni Raugei, sequenced the human Hp gene and discovered that there is a closely related gene in the vicinity. As they reported: "Southern blot analysis provides evidence for the presence of more than one haptoglobin gene per haploid genome and confirms that there is restriction site polymorphism at this locus." The next year, Smithies team, then at the University of Wisconsin, US, identified the same new gene and gave the name Hpr (for haptoglobin-related). The protein, Hpr, was determined by New York University Medical Center scientists Madhavi Muranjan, Victor Nussenzweig and Stephen Tomlinson in 1998.

== Structure ==
Hpr is 45-kDa in molecular size. It is structurally similar to haptoglobin with over 90% amino acid identity but in lesser concentration in the blood. Like haptoglobin, it is composed of α- and β-chain which are connected through a disulfide bond. It lacks a glycosylation site and a cysteine involved in inter-α-chain bonding that are present in haptoglobin. Haptoglobin has either 1 (Hp1 genotype) or 2 (Hp2 genotype) of such cysteines. The α-chain of Hpr contains a hydrophobic signal peptide, which is absent in haptoglobin. The signal peptide makes Hpr associated with ApoL 1.

The HPR gene originated from duplication of the HP gene and is present at 2.2 kilobase pairs downstream of the HP gene on the long arm of chromosome 16 in humans. HPR is 94% similar in DNA sequence to HP gene. The gene is also present in apes and Old World monkeys in which it is created from a gene triplication (additional HP gene is present) during early evolution of the primate group. Some humans have additional copy of HPR gene. The gene product has 28-amino acid differences, 16 of which occur in the β chain. HPR has longer intron, 9.5 kilobase pairs compared to 1.3 kilobase pairs of that of haptoglobin. It contains a retrovirus-like element that is not found in haptoglobin.

== Function ==
Haptoglobin is known to be a high affinity-binding protein for haemoglobin during red blood cell destruction (haemolysis). Since Hpr is an accessory protein, it was initially believed that it that does not bind haemoglobin. However, an experiment in 2006 showed that it binds to haemoglobin with same affinity as haptoglobin. Unlike haptoglobin which binds to the scavenger receptor CD163, a protein on macrophages that is critical for eliminating bacterial infection, Hpr has no affinity for the receptor indicating that its primary role is different.

The major function of Hpr is protection from infection with Trypanosoma brucei to provide natural resistance to African sleeping sickness. Together with haptolglobin and apoliproproteins, it makes up a trypanolytic factor TLF 1 in the blood of primates that can kill invading the animal strain of T. brucei (specifically T. b. brucei). However, chimpanzees have mutated Hpr so that their serum cannot kill T. b. brucei. The human strains, T. b. rhodesiense and T. b. gambiense have acquired resistance to TLF indicating an evolutionary arms race between primates and the protozoan parasite. Hpr is also involved in TLF 2 in which its function is not yet understood.
