= Winterbottom's sign =

- Differential diagnosis: African trypanosomiasis

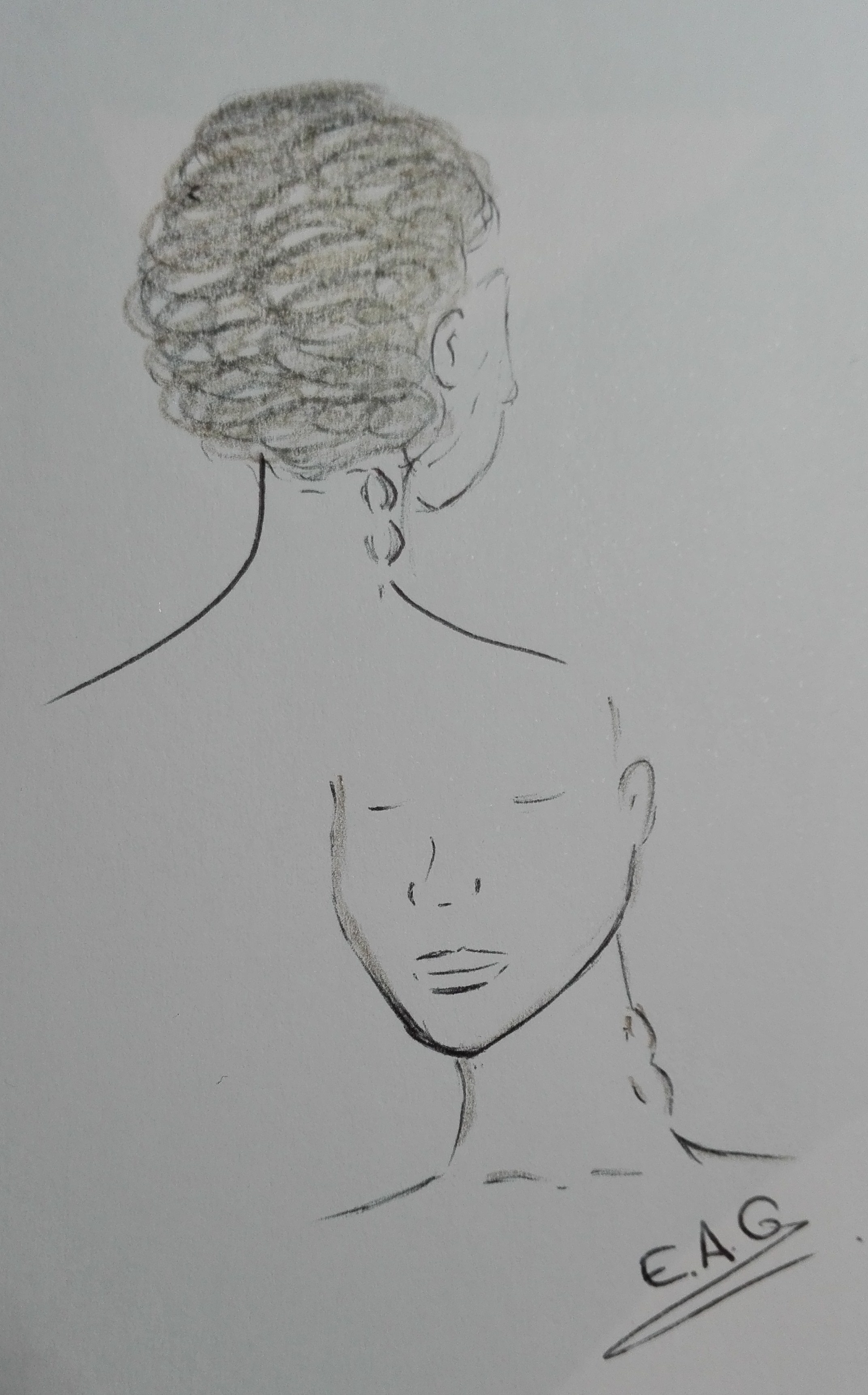
A sketch of two women suffering from Winterbottom's Sign

Winterbottom's sign is a swelling of lymph nodes (lymphadenopathy) along the posterior cervical lymph node chain, associated with the early phase of African trypanosomiasis (African sleeping sickness), a disease caused by the parasites Trypanosoma brucei rhodesiense and Trypanosoma brucei gambiense. It may be suggestive of cerebral infection.

The sign was first reported by the English physician Thomas Masterman Winterbottom in 1803. Winterbottom observed that slave traders would palpate the necks of slaves before purchasing them, likely to prevent losses from their human merchandise by sleeping sickness.
