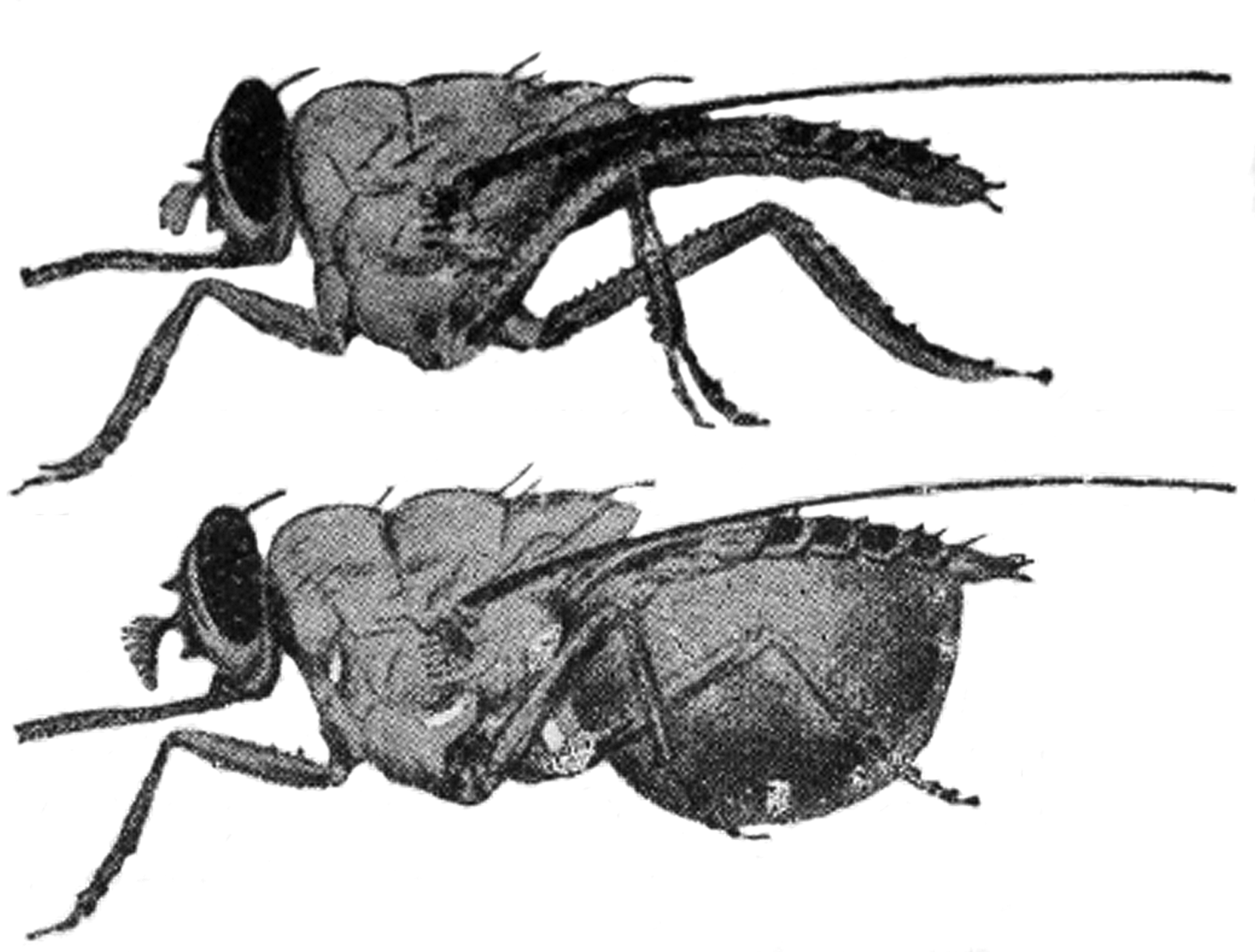

Scientific classification
- Kingdom: Animalia
- Phylum: Arthropoda
- Clade: Pancrustacea
- Class: Insecta
- Order: Diptera
- Family: Glossinidae
- Genus: Glossina
- Species: G. palpalis

Binomial name
- Glossina palpalis (Robineau-Desvoidy, 1830)
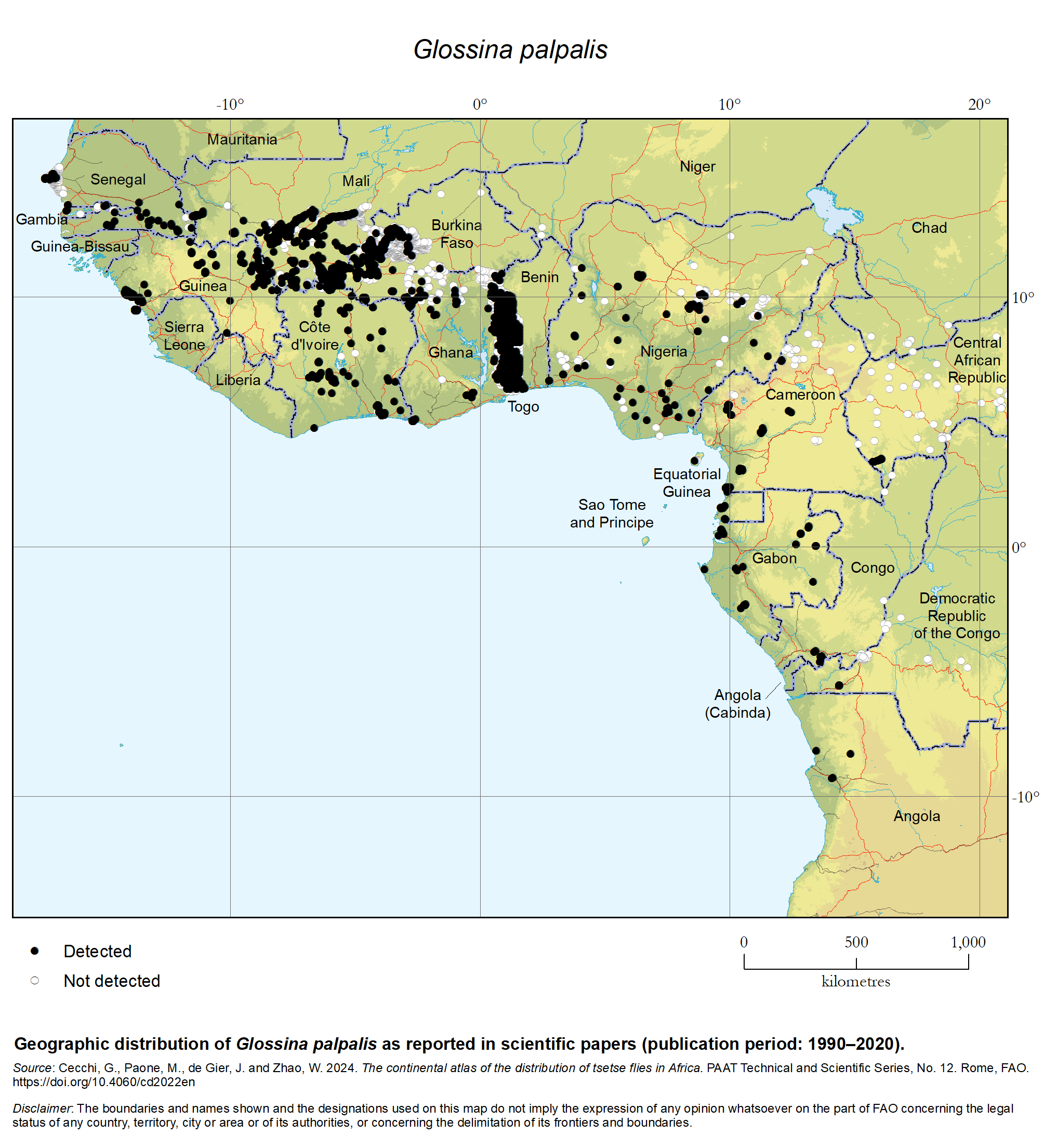
- Geographic distribution of Glossina palpalis as reported in scientific papers – Publication period 1990–2020

= Glossina palpalis =

Species of tsetse fly

Glossina palpalis is one of the 23 recognized species of tsetse flies (genus Glossina), and it belongs to the riverine/palpalis group (subgenus Nemorhina). Glossina palpalis is an important vector of African trypanosomiasis, including both the form affecting livestock and the one affecting humans.

== Taxonomy ==
Two subspecies of G. palpalis are recognized:

- Glossina palpalis palpalis (Robineau-Desvoidy, 1830)
- Glossina palpalis gambiensis (Vanderplank, 1911)

== Distribution ==
Glossina palpalis is known to be present in 20 countries in western Africa and central Africa, stretching from Senegal to Angola. Data on its occurrence in the peer-reviewed scientific literature for the period 1990–2020 is available for 16 countries; Angola, Burkina Faso, Cameroon, the Central African Republic, Congo, Côte d'Ivoire, the Democratic Republic of the Congo, Equatorial Guinea, Gabon, the Gambia, Ghana, Guinea, Mali, Nigeria, Senegal and Togo, while reports from Benin, Guinea-Bissau, Liberia and Sierra Leone date back to earlier periods, or they have not been published in the peer-reviewed scientific literature.

As to the two subspecies of Glossina palpalis, Glossina palpalis gambiensis occupies the western part of the range, while Glossina palpalis palpalis occupies the eastern and southern part. Except for a narrow zone of contact where hybridization can occur, they are believed to be geographically separated, with the separation estimated to have occurred during the last glacial period approximately 12,000 years ago.

=== Glossina palpalis gambiensis ===
Glossina palpalis gambiensis occupies the western part of the distribution of Glossina palpalis, from Senegal to Ghana. In the peer-reviewed scientific literature for the period 1990–2020, Glossina palpalis gambiensis was reported from seven countries, namely Burkina Faso, northern Côte d'Ivoire, the Gambia, northern Ghana, Guinea, southern Mali, and Senegal. The single report from Nigeria, which is based only on molecular identification techniques and it is located at more than 500 km from the closest confirmed record of Glossina palpalis gambiensis, would need further evidence for corroboration. Reports from Guinea-Bissau, Liberia, Sierra Leone and Togo do exist, but they either date back to periods before 1990 or they have not been published in the peer-reviewed scientific literature.

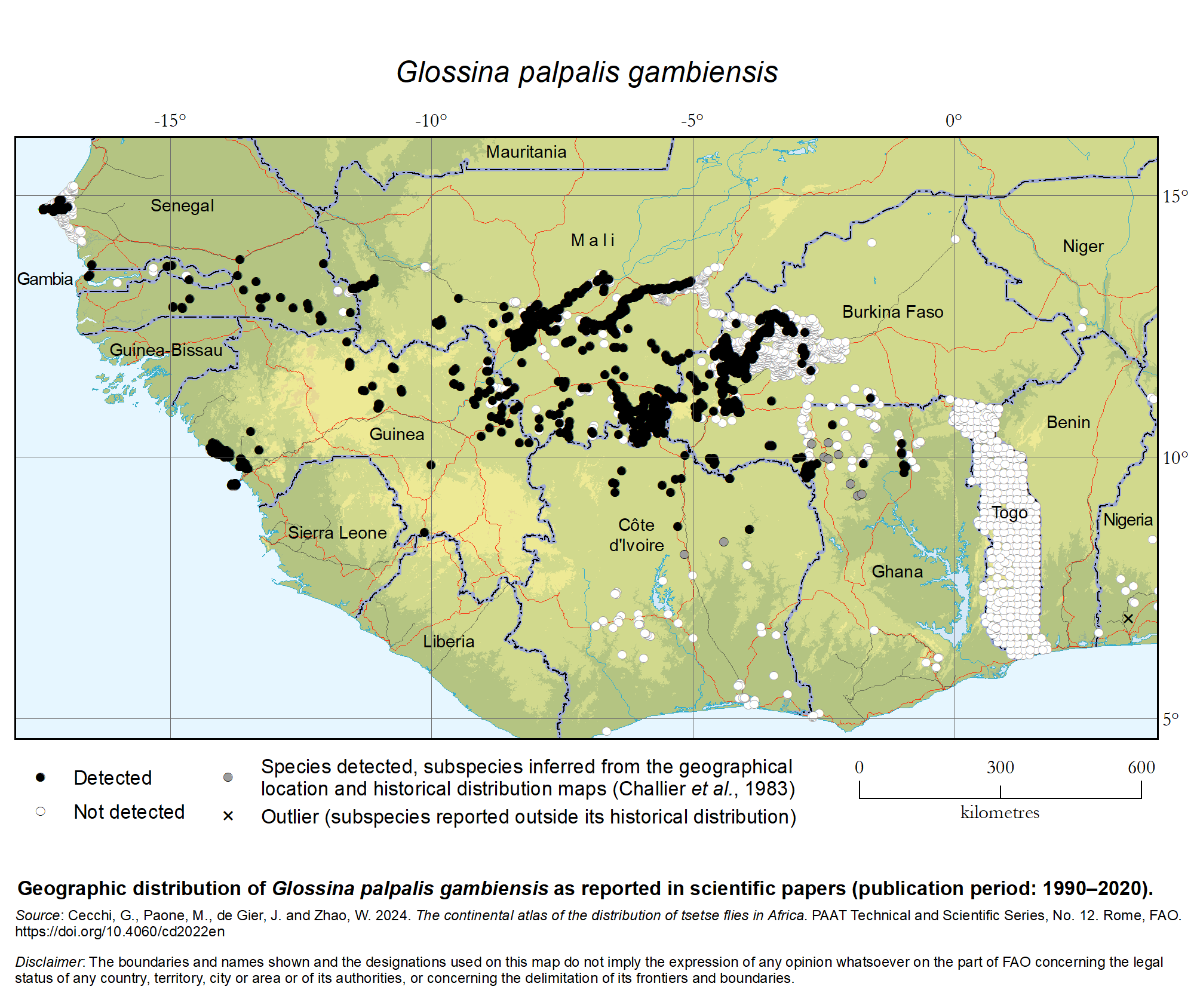
Geographic distribution of Glossina palpalis gambiensis as reported in scientific papers –Publication period 1990–2020.

=== Glossina palpalis palpalis ===
Glossina palpalis palpalis occupies the eastern and southern part of the distribution of Glossina palpalis, from Sierra Leone to Angola. In the peer-reviewed scientific literature for the period 1990–2020, G. palpalis palpalis was reported from north-western Angola, western Cameroon, south-western Central African Republic, south-western Congo, southern Côte d'Ivoire, western Democratic Republic of the Congo, Equatorial Guinea, Gabon, southern Ghana, Nigeria, and Togo, while no published record for the period was available for Benin, Guinea, Liberia and Sierra Leone.

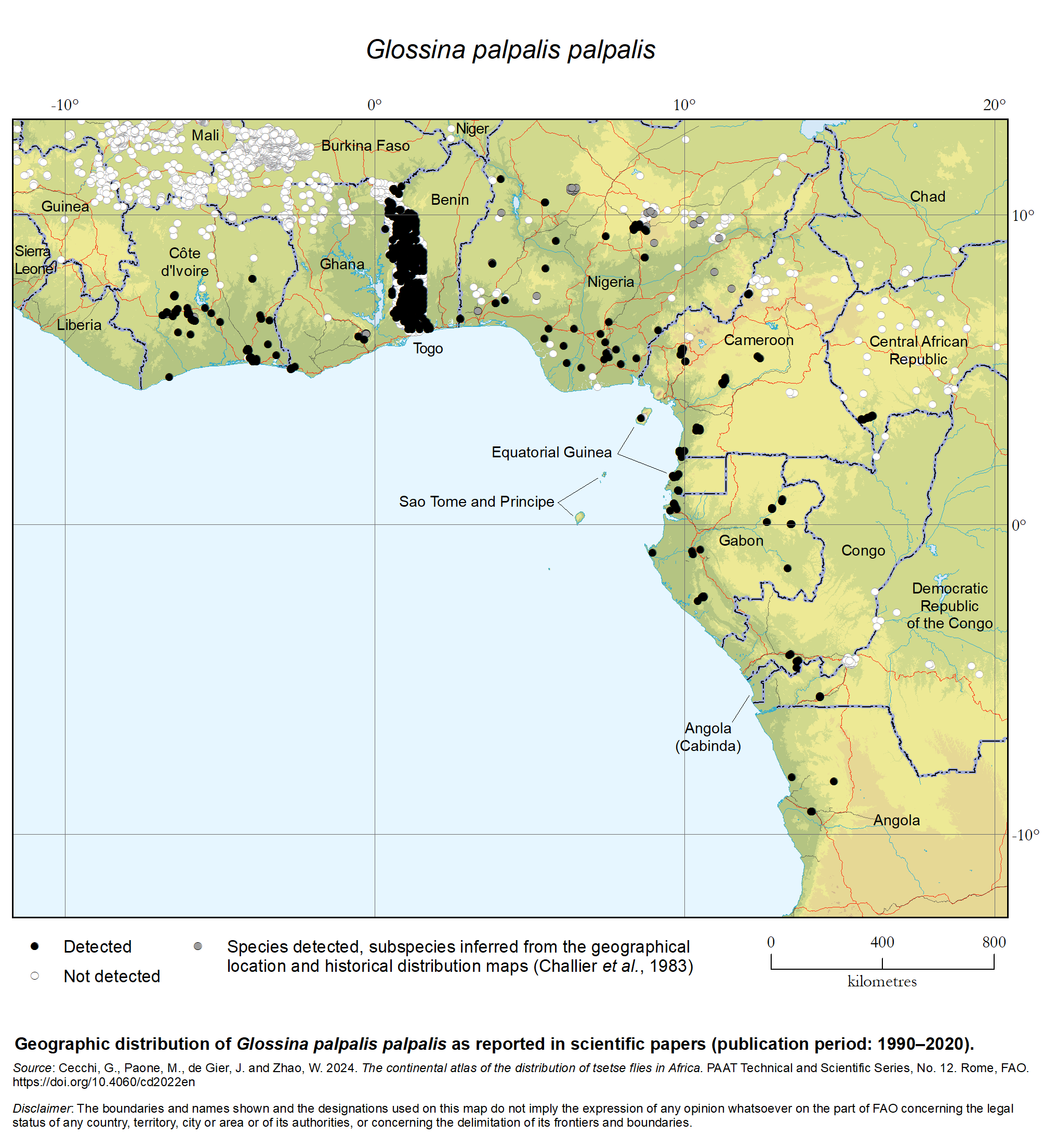
Geographic distribution of Glossina palpalis palpalis as reported in scientific papers –Publication period 1990–2020
