= Robert Olley =

English painter

- Olley painting "The Orgy", 1979
- Born: 16 January 1940 (age 86); South Shields, Tyne and Wear, England
- Education: Self taught
- Known for: Oil painting, line drawing, bronze and cold cast metals
- Notable work: Westoe Netty
- Website: robertolley.co.uk

Robert "Bob" Olley (born 16 January 1940) is an artist and sculptor best known for his mining subjects, humorous drawings and paintings of everyday life, especially his iconic painting and internationally acclaimed Westoe Netty.

== Career ==
Born into a mining family in 1940 and educated at Westoe Secondary Modern, Olley began his working life 1955 as a painter and decorator before going into the mining industry in which he spent eleven years at Whitburn Colliery until the pit closed 1968. Leaving the industry he joined Plessey Telecoms by which time he was developing his artistic talents with the hope of becoming a professional magazine illustrator supplementing his income by selling his paintings at the Sunday Painters Exhibition on Bayswater Road, London.

By 1972 he had two exhibitions under his belt. It was in the second of these that the now world-famous painting Westoe Netty was first exhibited. There was an outcry of indecency from an alderman who attempted to have the show closed down. By the time the council had met and discussed the problem the exhibition was finished but the publicity that it had generated catapulted Olley's career forward allowing him to leave the telecoms industry in 1974 and become a full-time professional painter selling his work with like- minded artists on the Armstrong Bridge, Newcastle every Sunday.

Between 1972 and 1978 he completed many commissions producing work for both Tyne Tees and BBC, a theatre company and a number of murals. By now he had moved into the field of ceramics and cold cast bronze figurines which, along with drawings and paintings made up one hundred works in total for his first one-man exhibition "The Heart and Humour of the North East” Robert Olley Sculpture Castings Ltd. was formed 1979 to produce a range of small cold cast bronze mining figures from his factory in Washington. The 1984/5 coal strike was a disaster for the business and as orders dried up he closed the factory and relocated to South Shields where he opened "The Gambling Man Gallery" that became a popular attraction of the town's Catherine Cookson Trail.

In the following years he worked on some large projects like sculptures of John Simpson Kirkpatrick, the towns WW1 Hero of Gallipoli and Stan Laurel for Persimmon Homes sited in Dockwray Square North Shields and unveiled by MP Mr Neville Trotter. The sculpture of John Simpson Kirkpatrick was erected In 1988, in Ocean Road, not far from the town's museum. The 2.5m tall bronze coloured sculpture, mounted on a large concrete base, was unveiled by the Mayor, Councillor Albert Tate.

In 1995, the towns MP Dr. David Clark opened "Old, New, Borrowed and Blue" Olleys' first exhibition for seventeen years. After the success of the exhibition he spent time in Spain working on new material and gaining fresh inspiration. In 1996, NEXUS, the Tyne and Wear Transport Executive sponsored "Robert Olley at Work." The exhibition was opened by its Director General Mr. Mike Parker. As artist in residence Olley spent four weeks working in the gallery of The Customs House, South Shields where he painted the 16 ft x 4 ft mural "Famous Faces" depicting North East personalities from the world of sport, TV, music, business and the church peering from the windows of a metro carriage. It is now displayed at Monument metro station, Newcastle.

2000. "This, that and some of the other" a display of some fifty paintings mostly documenting everyday street life at the beginning of the new century. The largest painting displayed, "Off the Way" (Three miners lifting a coal truck back onto the track) is featured on the front cover of the 2002 publication "Shafts of Light" Mining Art in the Great Northern Coalfield. The exhibition was opened by actor, comedian and radio presenter Mike Elliott. Later that year South Shield's twin town Noisy –Le –Sec, France invited him to show his work in the Centre Gerard- Philipe. The exhibition was opened by Mm. Claude Roger Secretary General of the Comite De Jumilage De Noisy-Le-Sec. Although it didn't have a theme was exceptionally well received by the French and especially by the many parties of school children that attended as part of the project. He was astonished at the amount of interest that the pupils showed in the mining subjects and spent much of the time answering their questions. There is now a permanent display of his mining sculpture that is exhibited around the schools in the area around Paris. Having briefly returned to the subject of coal mining the Hutchinson Gallery, Bishop Auckland in 2002 invited Olley to exhibit. "Toil, Sweat, Water and Dust" was opened by the late Mr David Guy, President, DMA & NUM North East Area. Olley said he was returning to his roots as Durham was the heart of the mining industry for more than a century. Both his great-grandfathers Robert Smith, an illiterate miner born in Coundon, and Peter Greenwell, a publican in Croxdale, managed several public houses in the area including the Britannia Inn in the city.

To celebrate forty years of Town Twinning Noisy-Le-Sec commissioned Olley to design a mural to commemorate the occasion. The 4x3 metre panel depicting the links with South Shields, Arganda del Rey (Spain) and Djeol (Mauritania) was unveiled by Madam le Maire, Nicol RIVOIRE in 2003.

In June, after completing the twin town mural he visited an exhibition of Marc Chagall in Paris. Inspired by Chagall's abstract works on the fables of Jean de la Fontaine, he started a new work with a changed subject, medium and style. The subject was the fables of Aesop, the medium, gouache and the style semi-abstract. Olley visited Greece, the birthplace of Aesop and researched almost six hundred fables, produced many rough sketches and in the space of twelve weeks completed forty works to be exhibited. The Exhibition, "Olley on Aesop" was opened by Member of Parliament for South Shields, David Miliband. The following December the exhibition went to the McGuiness Gallery, Bishop Auckland.

After the Aesop exhibitions, he turned his attention to the French fabulist La Fontaine. Twenty new works were produced for exhibitions in both the twin towns of Noisy-Le-Sec and Épinay-Sur-Seine. Opened officially the mayors of both towns Mm Rivoire and Mr Herve Chevreau respectively.

South Tyneside District Hospital commissioned Olley in 2005 to produce a mural for the children's waiting area of the radiography department and a large painting for the adult area. For the mural he reverted to the style of the Aesop fables with bright colours and many animals. This mural work continued in 2006 with a commission from the Primary Care Trust for the new health centre situated in Flagg Court. The theme of the 4 x 1.5-metre bas relief wall metallic finish panel was health, care and water from Celtic times to the present incorporating the history of the borough, titled, "Salus Curatio et Aqua." Sited in the reception area it was unveiled by the towns MP Mr David Miliband who officially opened the centre in July 2007.

In 2008, he travelled to Chengdu, Sichuan Province, China to work in the foundry that he contracted to cast the life sized bronze sculpture of Stan Laurel (his second Laurel sculpture) commissioned by Wear Valley District Council. The statue that had survived the earth quake that devastated the foundry and surrounding of Sichuan in May finally arrived in the UK after a 5.000-mile journey was unveiled 4 September that year by Nancy Wardell, Stan's niece to the applause of "Sons of the Desert" the international Laurel and Hardy appreciation society. Stan on his black marble plinth stands on Theatre Corner, Bishop Auckland Town Centre, the site of the Eden Theatre owned at one time by his father.

In June 2010, Bob Olley opened his latest exhibition "Mining to Abstraction". According to Olley, techniques for this exhibition have been gleaned from Egyptian, Assyrian, Mongolian, Chinese and Mexican art. He also drew inspiration from the Hindu culture, its art, sculpture and vibrant colours. The main exhibition was based on the Kama Sutra and erotic statues that adorn the temples of Khajuraho and executed in the rich colours of the Indian continent. This new body of work is in sharp contrast to his earlier mining paintings and drawings that formed part of this retrospective and celebratory exhibition.

== Personal life ==
Olley has four children, Daryl, Dene, Graeme, and Kim and 12 Grandchildren, Sean, Sam, Neve, Lewis, Emily, Jessika, Lucy, Daryl, Harry and Josephine.

== Notable works ==
The Westoe Netty

- Westoe Netty (Oil Painting)
- John Simpson Kirkpatrick (Sculpture)
- Windows (Oil Painting)
- Off the Way (Oil Painting)
- Salus Curatio et Aqua (Bas Relief Sculpture)
- Stan Laurel (Bronze Sculpture)
- The Grey Horse (Pub Sign at the Grey Horse, Consett)
