= Apolipoprotein L1 =

Protein found in humans

APOL1
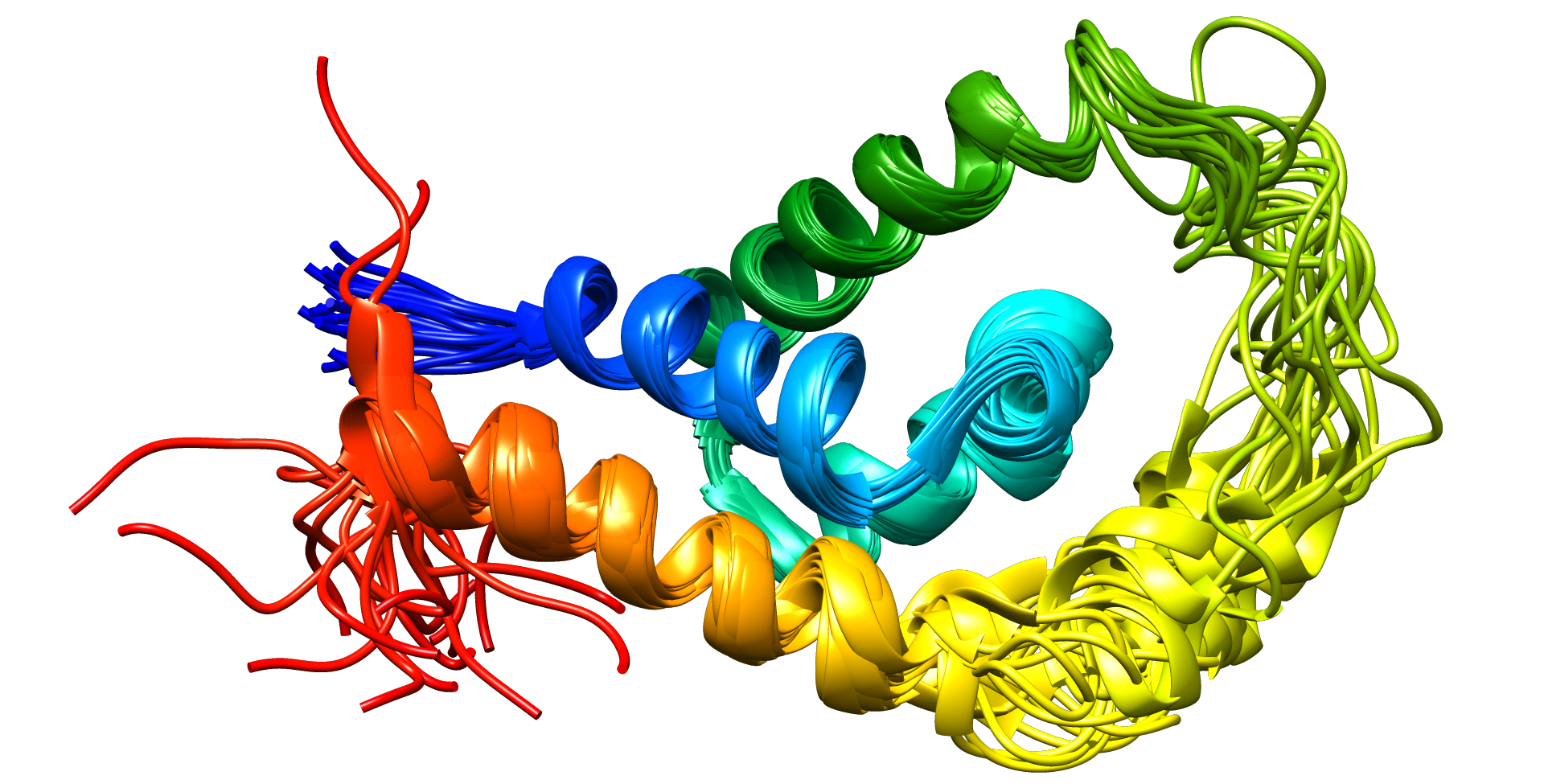

Identifiers
- Aliases: APOL1, APO-L, APOL, APOL-I, FSGS4, apolipoprotein L1
- External IDs: OMIM: 607254, 603743; GeneCards: APOL1
Available structures
PDB	Human UniProt search: PDBe RCSB
PDB	List of PDB id codes 7L6K, 7LF7, 7LFA, 7LFB, 7LFD

Gene location (Human)
Chr.	Chromosome 22 (human)
Band	22q12.3	Start	36,253,071 bp
Band	22q12.3	End	36,267,530 bp
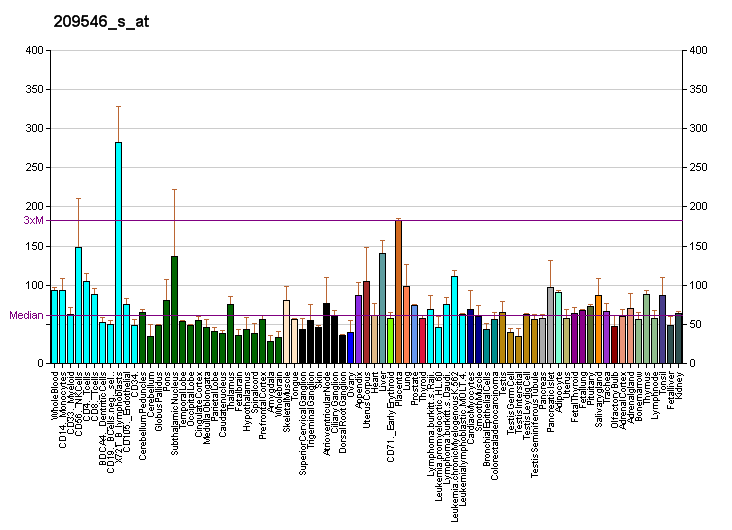
RNA expression pattern
Bgee	Human / Mouse (ortholog); Top expressed in: gallbladder; right lobe of liver; smooth muscle tissue; appendix; pericardium; upper lobe of left lung; apex of heart; decidua; nasal epithelium; right lung / n/a; More reference expression data
BioGPS	More reference expression data
Gene ontology
Molecular function	protein binding; chloride channel activity; lipid binding
Cellular component	extracellular region; intrinsic component of membrane; blood microparticle; very-low-density lipoprotein particle; high-density lipoprotein particle; extracellular space; endoplasmic reticulum lumen
Biological process	lipoprotein metabolic process; steroid metabolic process; lipid transport; innate immune response; cholesterol metabolic process; cytolysis; receptor-mediated endocytosis; killing of cells of other organism; lipid metabolism; post-translational protein modification; chloride transmembrane transport; transport
Sources:Amigo / QuickGO
Orthologs
Databases	NCBI: entry; OMA: entry
Species	Human	Mouse
Entrez	8542	n/a
Ensembl	ENSG00000100342	n/a
UniProt	O14791	n/a
RefSeq (mRNA)	NM_001136540; NM_001136541; NM_003661; NM_145343; NM_145344 NM_001362927	n/a
RefSeq (protein)	NP_001130012; NP_001130013; NP_003652; NP_663318; NP_001349856	n/a
Location (UCSC)	Chr 22: 36.25 – 36.27 Mb	n/a
PubMed search		n/a
- Wikidata
View/Edit Human

Apolipoprotein L1 is a protein that in humans is encoded by the APOL1 gene. Two transcript variants encoding two different isoforms have been found for this gene.

== Species distribution ==
This gene is found only in humans, African green monkeys, and gorillas.

== Structure ==
The gene that encodes the APOL1 protein is 14,522 base pairs long and found on the human chromosome 22, on the long arm at position 13.1 from base pair 36,253,070 to base pair 36,267,530.

The protein is a 398 amino acid protein. It consists of 5 functional domains:

- S domain-secretory signal
- MAD (membrane-addressing domain)-ph sensor and regulator of cell death
- BH3 domain - associated with programmed cell death
- PFD (pore forming domain)
- SRA (serum resistance-associated binding domain)- confers resistance to Trypanosoma brucei

=== Mutations ===
Two coding variants, G1 and G2, have been recently identified with relevance to human phenotypes. The G1 is a pair of two non-synonymous single nucleotide polymorphisms (SNPs) in almost complete linkage disequilibrium. G2 is an in-frame deletion of the two amino acid residues, N388 and Y389.

== Function ==
Apolipoprotein L1 (apoL1) is a minor apolipoprotein component of HDL cholesterol which is synthesized in the liver and also in many other tissues, including pancreas, kidney, and brain. APOL1 is found in vascular endothelium, liver, heart, lung, placenta, podocytes, proximal tubules, and arterial cells. The protein as a secreted form that allows it to circulate in the blood. It forms a complex, known as a trypanosome lytic factor (TLF), with high-density lipoprotein 3 (HDL3) particles that also contain apolipoprotein A1 (APOA1) and the hemoglobin-binding, haptoglobin-related protein (HPR). The APOL1 protein acts as the main lytic component in this complex. Once taken up by the trypanosome, the complex is trafficked to acidic endosomes, where the APOL1 protein may insert into the endosomal membrane. If the endosome is then recycled to the plasma membrane, where it encounters neutral pH conditions, APOL1 may form cation-selective channels.

APOL1 is a member of a family of apolipoproteins which also includes six other proteins and it is a member of bcl2 genes which are involved in autophagic cell death. In fact an overabundance of APOL1 within a cell results in autophagy.

APOL1 may play a role in the inflammatory response. Pro-inflammatory cytokines interferon-γ(IFN), tumor necrosis factor-α (TNF-α) and p53 can increase the expression of APOL1.

APOL1 has a role in innate immunity by protecting against Trypanosoma brucei infection, which is a parasite transmitted by the tsetse fly. Trypanosomes endocytose the secreted form of APOL1; APOL1 forms pores on the lysosomal membranes of the trypanosomes which causes in influx of chloride, swelling of the lysosome and lysis of the trypanosome.

== Clinical significance ==
=== African trypanosomiasis (sleeping sickness) ===
Although its intracellular function has not been elucidated, apoL1 circulating in plasma has the ability to kill the trypanosome Trypanosoma brucei that causes sleeping sickness. Recently, two coding sequence variants in APOL1 have been shown to associate with kidney disease in a recessive fashion while at the same time conferring resistance against Trypanosoma brucei rhodesiense. This resistance is due, in part, to decreased binding of the G1 and G2 APOL1 variants to the T. b. rhodesiense virulence factor, serum resistance-associated protein (SRA) as a result of the C-terminal polymorphisms. People who have at least one copy of either the G1 or G2 variant are resistant to infection by trypanosomes, but people who have two copies of either variant are at an increased risk of developing a non-diabetic kidney disease.

=== Kidney disease ===
The distribution of the variants most associated with kidney disease risk was analyzed in African populations and found to be more prevalent in western compared to northeastern African populations and absent in Ethiopia, consistent with the reported protection from forms of kidney disease known to be associated with the APOL1 variants. In the Yoruba people of Nigeria (West Africa), the prevalence of G1 and G2 risk alleles are 40% and 8% respectively. African nations with high frequencies of APOL1 risk alleles also have large populations of Trypanosomes suggesting that the risk alleles underwent positive selection as a defense mechanism. The existence of these variants are only found on African chromosomes and exist in people with recent African ancestry (<10,000 years).

Many African Americans are descendants of people of West African nations and consequently, also have a high prevalence of APOL1 risk alleles as well as APOL1 associated kidney diseases. The frequency of the risk alleles in African Americans is more than 30%. The existence of these alleles has been shown to increase the risk of developing diseases such as Focal Segmental Glomerulosclerosis(FSGS), Hypertension Attributed-End Stage Kidney Disease (ESKD), and HIV-Associated Nephropathy(HIVAN).

The prevalence of the risk alleles in African Americans with these kidney diseases shown in recent studies are 67% in HIVAN, 66% in FSGS, and 47% in hypertension-attributed ESKD. Hispanic populations such as Dominicans and Puerto Ricans demonstrate a mixture of genetic influences that include African ancestry resulting in a prevalence of the APOL1 variants as well. Studies have also determined the prevalence of each individual allele in FSGS cases as well.

==== Focal segmental glomerulosclerosis (FSGS) ====
The prevalence of the G1 risk allele in African Americans with FSGS is 52% and 18–23% in those without FSGS. The prevalence of the G2 risk allele in African Americans with FSGS is 23% and 15% in those without FSGS. FSGS is a kidney disease that affects younger individuals therefore, its effects are slightly different from the effects of general non-diabetic ESKD. In a recent study, the mean ages of onset of FSGS for African Americans with 2, 1, and 0 APOL1 risk alleles was 32yrs, 36yrs and 39yrs, respectively. APOL1 variants also have a tendency to manifest FSGS at relatively young ages; FSGS begins between the ages of 15 and 39 in 70% of individuals with two APOL1 risk alleles and 42% of individuals with of 0 or 1 risk alleles.

==== Pathogenesis ====
Although possession of the APOL1 risk variants increases susceptibility to non-diabetic kidney disease, not all people who possess these variants develop kidney disease, which indicates another factor may initiate progression of kidney disease. Similarly in HIV positive patients, although the majority of African-American patients with HIVAN have two APOL1 risk alleles other as yet unknown factors in the host, including genetic risk variants and environmental or viral factors, may influence the development of this disorder in those with zero or one APOL1 risk allele. Kidney Int. 2012 Aug;82(3):338-43. The African American population has a total lifetime risk of developing FSGS of 0.8%. For those with 0 risk alleles the risk of developing FSGS is 0.2%, 0.3% with 1 risk allele, 4.25% with 2 risk alleles and a 50% chance of developing HIVAN for untreated HIV infected individuals.

People with these allelic variants who develop ESKD begin dialysis at an earlier age than ESKD patients without the risk alleles. On average, those with two risk alleles begin dialysis approximately 10 years earlier than ESKD patients without the risk variants. The mean ages of initiation of dialysis of African American ESKD patients with two risk alleles, one risk allele, or no risk alleles are approximately 48yrs, 53yrs, and 58 yrs, respectively. Compared to African American ESKD patients, Hispanic ESKD patients with two APOL1 risk variants start dialysis at an earlier age, 41 yrs.

Although, the age of initiation of dialysis is earlier with one risk allele this effect is only seen in those with the G1 variant. In a study, ~96% of patients with two risk alleles started dialysis before the age of 75 compared to 94% for G1 heterozygotes, and 84% for those with no risk alleles.

Kidneys from donors containing two APOL1 variants experience allograft failure more rapidly than donors with 0 or 1 variants. Kidney recipients who have copies of the APOL1 risk variants, but do not receive kidneys from donors with the risk variants do not have decreased survival rates of the donated kidneys. These observations together suggest that the genotype of the donor only affects allograft survival.
