= Dorothy Samuelson-Sandvid =

English author and journalist (1902–1984)

- Born: Dorothy Samuelson-Sandvid; 14 November 1902; South Shields, County Durham, England
- Died: August 1984 (aged 81); Acomb, Northumberland, England
- Education: St. Johns' Higher Grade School, South Shields
- Occupations: Author, journalist
- Writing career
- Pen name: Dorfy
- Period: wrote for Shields Gazette from before the War until about 1970
- Genres: family stories and her own take on the general news
- Subject: Geordie Dialect
- Notable works: Basinful o' Geordie: Tyneside Readings (1970) Between Ye an' Me (1969); I Remember (1976) Watt cheor? (197?)
- Movements: Shields, Irthington, Shields, Allendale, Hexham.

Dorothy Samuelson-Sandvid (14 November 1902 – August 1984), known as Dorfy, was an English dialect author and journalist who specialised in the Geordie dialect.

== Early life ==
Born Dorothy Pilbin in 1902 to a Quaker family in George Scott Street, South Shields, County Durham influenced by her childhood, she went on to write works concerned with the Geordie dialect. Educated at St. Johns' Higher Grade School, South Shields. As there was no work for her father the family moved from Shields to Irthington, then back to Shields before 1938, then to Allendale in 1946, and then Hexham in 1959.

== Career ==
Dorfy had her own column for many years in the Shields Gazette revolving around her early twentieth century South Shields upbringing; spoken in the Geordie dialect. In her later years she retired to Hexham.

== Bibliography ==
- Basinful o' Geordie (1988)
- Between Ye an' Me (1969)
- I Remember (1976); A book detailing reminiscences from 1910 – 1914.
- Mair Geordie Taalks
- Watt cheor? (197?)
- HOWAY HINNIES! Another Collection of Dialect Stories and Poems (195?)
