= Edward Cresswell =

English-South African Political activist

Edward Cresswell (born 1876) was an English-born South African trade unionist and political activist.

Born in South Shields in England, Cresswell began working for the North Eastern Railway in 1892. He joined a trade union, taking part in various cross-union conferences and a major railway strike in 1897.

In 1901, Cresswell emigrated to Cape Town, and became prominent in the Cape Labour Party. In 1912, he moved to Krugersdorp and joined the Shop Assistants', Warehousemen's and Clerks' Association, becoming its vice president the following year, and then president from 1918 until 1922. In 1914, he was elected as a Labour Party member of the Transvaal Provincial Council.

During World War I, Cresswell fought with the British Army in southern Africa. After the war, he became active in the Returned Soldiers' Movement, and declined an offer to become an Officer of the Order of the British Empire. In the 1920s, he served on the Advisory Council of Labour.
