= Base J =

Names
- IUPAC name 5-[(β-D-Glucopyranosyloxy)methyl]pyrimidine-2,4(1H,3H)-dione
- Systematic IUPAC name 5-({[(2R,3R,4S,5S,6R)-3,4,5-Trihydroxy-6-(hydroxymethyl)oxan-2-yl]oxy}methyl)pyrimidine-2,4(1H,3H)-dione
- Other names β-D-Glucosyl-5-hydroxymethyluracil β-D-Glucosyl-hydroxymethyluracil

Identifiers
CAS Number	53910-89-7
3D model (JSmol)	Interactive image
ChemSpider	32742278
PubChem CID	129852278
UNII	979DWB8FWS
- InChI: InChI=1S/C11H16N2O8/c14-2-5-6(15)7(16)8(17)10(21-5)20-3-4-1-12-11(19)13-9(4)18/h1,5-8,10,14-17H,2-3H2,(H2,12,13,18,19)/t5-,6-,7+,8-,10-/m1/s1 Key: SUDBRAWXUGTELR-HPFNVAMJSA-N; InChI=1/C11H16N2O8/c14-2-5-6(15)7(16)8(17)10(21-5)20-3-4-1-12-11(19)13-9(4)18/h1,5-8,10,14-17H,2-3H2,(H2,12,13,18,19)/t5-,6-,7+,8-,10-/m1/s1 Key: SUDBRAWXUGTELR-HPFNVAMJBD
- SMILES: c1c(c(=O)[nH]c(=O)[nH]1)CO[C@H]2[C@@H]([C@H]([C@@H]([C@H](O2)CO)O)O)O

Properties
Chemical formula	C_{11}H_{16}N_{2}O_{8}
Molar mass	304.255 g·mol^{−1}
- Except where otherwise noted, data are given for materials in their standard state (at 25 °C [77 °F], 100 kPa). Infobox references

β-D-Glucopyranosyloxymethyluracil or base J is a hypermodified nucleobase found in the DNA of kinetoplastids including the human pathogenic trypanosomes. It was discovered in 1993, in the trypanosome Trypanosoma brucei and was the first hypermodified nucleobase found in eukaryotic DNA; it has since been found in other kinetoplastids, including Leishmania. Within these organisms Base J acts as a RNA polymerase II transcription terminator, with its removal in knockout cells being accompanied by a massive read-through at RNA polymerase II termination sites, which ultimately proves lethal to the cell.

Base J is formed by the initial hydroxylation of thymidine and the subsequent glycosylation by a glycosyltransferase.

The biosynthesis of base J. A: thymidine hydroxylase; B: beta-glucosyltranferase; 1: dT (desoxy thymidine); 2: HOCH3dU; 3: dJ
