= South Tyneside College =

Location
- St. George's Avenue; South Shields, Tyne and Wear, NE34 6ET; England
- Coordinates: 54.986°N 1.420°W

Information
- Type: Further education
- Established: 1861
- Founder: Thomas Masterman Winterbottom
- Department for Education URN: 130555 Tables
- Ofsted: Reports
- Principal: Lindsey Whiterod
- Website: www.stc.ac.uk

South Tyneside College is a large further education college in South Tyneside in North East England. Its main site is in the town of South Shields. The college offers part-time and full-time courses for young students and adults. It was formed in 1984 by the merger of Hebburn Technical College and the Marine and Technical College, the latter founded in 1861 by a trust created by Dr Thomas Winterbottom, a former surgeon-general in Sierra Leone.

The Marine and Technical College, now known as South Shields Marine School, shares a campus with South Tyneside College and is one of the largest merchant navy training colleges in the United Kingdom, attracting students from as far afield as India and Africa. It offers courses in merchant navy training and marine education, including navigation, marine engineering, and electro-technical officer specifications.

== History and facilities ==
The college was formerly based in Ocean Road, South Shields, in a purpose-built building opened in 1869. Today, alongside maritime training facilities, there is a marine simulation centre at the main Westoe Campus on Grosvenor Road and offshore safety training facilities at the MOST Campus on Wapping Street. The planetarium was closed in 2008, despite local objection, and the space now houses a multi-faith chaplaincy. The college used to own a campus in Hebburn, but this was closed in 2011 due to upkeep costs.

Also on the Westoe Campus are the Dr Winterbottom Halls of Residence. Opening in 1978, Dr Winterbottom Halls of Residence comprises six residential blocks, with the majority of the residents being marine students. It became a tertiary college in 1986 after the council's education reorganisation.

== Sport ==
The college has had a rugby club since 1956. This is now known as South Shields RFC after changing its name in 2015. The club is based at the college and trains and plays its home games there. The club currently plays at level 9 in the rugby pyramid and plays in the Durham/Northumberland Three division and in Durham County Cup competitions. The club has three senior sides.

== Notable alumni ==
- Jade Thirlwall (born 1992), British singer known mononymously as Jade.
- Anna Foster (born 1979), BBC journalist, news reporter and presenter.
