= Small nucleolar RNA TBR17 =

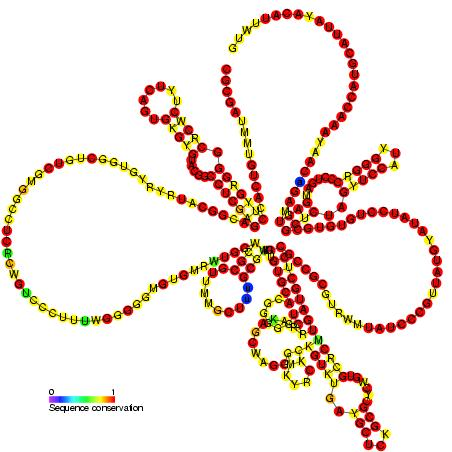
- Predicted secondary structure and sequence conservation of snoTBR17

Identifiers
- Symbol: snoTBR17
- Rfam: RF00294

Other data
- RNA type: Gene; snRNA; snoRNA; CD-box
- Domain: Eukaryota
- GO: GO:0006396 GO:0005730
- SO: SO:0000593
- PDB structures: PDBe

In molecular biology, Small nucleolar RNA TBR17 is a non-coding RNA (ncRNA) molecule identified in Trypanosoma brucei which functions in the modification of other small nuclear RNAs (snRNAs). This type of modifying RNA is usually located in the nucleolus of the eukaryotic cell which is a major site of snRNA biogenesis. It is known as a small nucleolar RNA (snoRNA) and also often referred to as a guide RNA.

snoRNA TBR17 belongs to the C/D box class of snoRNAs which contain the conserved sequence motifs known as the C box (UGAUGA) and the D box (CUGA). Most of the members of the box C/D family function in directing site-specific 2'-O-methylation of substrate RNAs.

TBR17 was one of seventeen snoRNAs identified in Trypanosoma brucei by immunoprecipitation with anti-fibrillarin antibodies. Together with TBR5 and TBR7 it is a part of a tandemly repeated snoRNA gene cluster, located within the spliced leader RNA (SLA). The cluster genes are produced as polycistronic RNAs.

== See also ==
- Small nucleolar RNA TBR2
