= Small nucleolar RNA TBR7 =

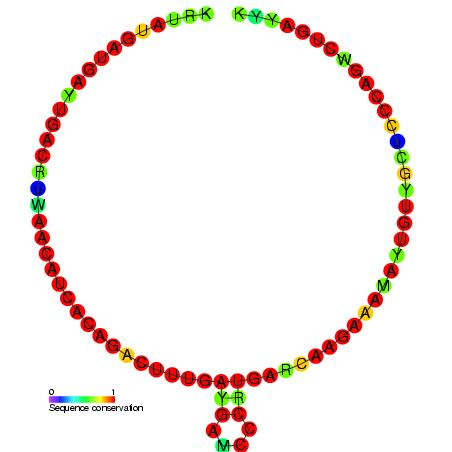
- Predicted secondary structure and sequence conservation of snoTBR7

Identifiers
- Symbol: snoTBR7
- Rfam: RF00295

Other data
- RNA type: Gene; snRNA; snoRNA; CD-box
- Domain: Eukaryota
- GO: GO:0006396 GO:0005730
- SO: SO:0000593
- PDB structures: PDBe

In molecular biology, Small nucleolar RNA TBR7 is a non-coding RNA (ncRNA) molecule identified in Trypanosoma brucei which functions in the modification of other small nuclear RNAs (snRNAs). This type of modifying RNA is usually located in the nucleolus of the eukaryotic cell which is a major site of snRNA biogenesis. It is known as a small nucleolar RNA (snoRNA) and also often referred to as a guide RNA.

snoRNA TBR7 belongs to the C/D box class of snoRNAs which contain the conserved sequence motifs known as the C box (UGAUGA) and the D box (CUGA). Most of the members of the box C/D family function in directing site-specific 2'-O-methylation of substrate RNAs.

TBR7 was one of seventeen snoRNAs identified in Trypanosoma brucei by immunoprecipitation with anti-fibrillarin antibodies. It is predicted to guide the 2'O ribosome methylation of 18s ribosomal RNA (rRNA).

Together with TBR5 and TBR17 it is a part of a tandemly repeated snoRNA gene cluster, located within the spliced leader RNA (SLA). The cluster genes are produced as polycistronic RNA.

== See also ==
Small nucleolar RNA TBR2
