= Thomas Masterman Winterbottom =

English physician, philanthropist and abolitionist

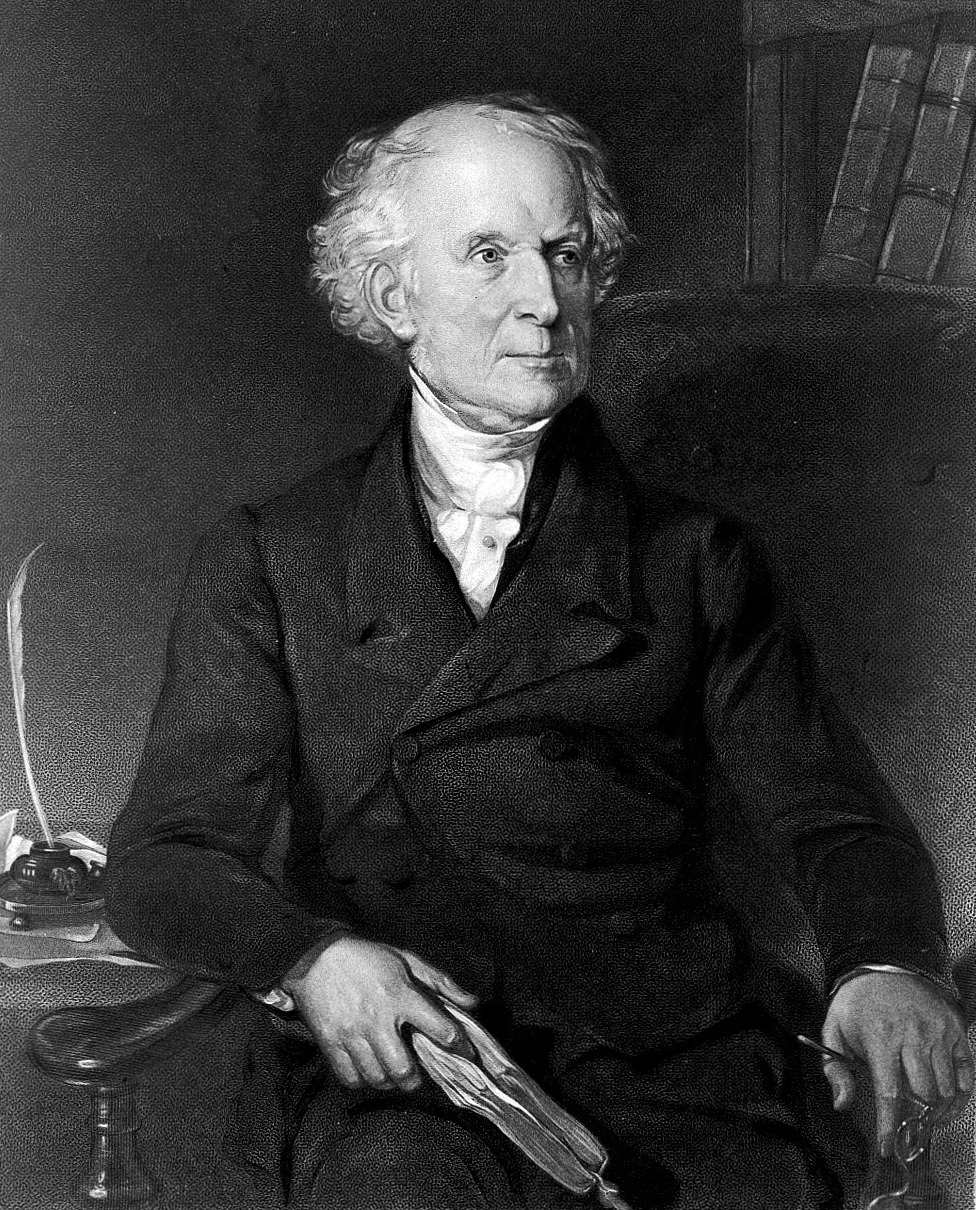
Thomas Masterman Winterbottom

Thomas Masterman Winterbottom (26 March 1766, in South Shields – 8 July 1859) was an English physician, philanthropist and abolitionist remembered for describing African trypanosomiasis and the associated Winterbottom's sign.

== Biography ==
Thomas Winterbottom was the eldest son of Dr. James Winterbottom, a surgeon-apothecary, and Lydia née Masterman, and was educated by the local Curate. He studied medicine at the University of Edinburgh and then the University of Glasgow. He was appointed physician to the colony of the Sierra Leone Company in 1792, spending four years in Africa. During this period he accepted John Macaulay Wilson into his household. Wilson went on to become one of the first European-trained African medical staff in Africa. In 1793, Winterbottom became one of the founder members of the Newcastle Literary and Philosophical Society. In 1796 he returned to South Tyneside to take over his father's practice in South Shields. He wrote an account of his time in Africa which was published in 1803, and which contains the description of African trypanosomiasis (sleeping sickness), for which he is known. He noted that slave traders used the sign of neck swelling as an indicator of sleepiness, and would avoid those slaves; this sign of cervical lymphadenopathy became his eponymous sign.

He married in 1803, and settled in Westoe. He ran his general practice for 30 years, and published several medical books and papers. He retained his interest in medicine until his death at the age of 93, at the time the oldest doctor in Britain.

His wife had died in 1840, and he had no children, so his considerable estate was left to a number of charities which he had supported during his life. The bulk of this bequest was to found the South Shields Marine College, which he had established in 1837. His friends, including Robert Ingham MP and Richard Shortridge MP, ensured that the college opened on 26 March 1866, on the centenary of Winterbottom's birth. The college later became South Tyneside College.
