= Rifapentine =

Antibiotic against tuberculosis

Clinical data
- Trade names: Priftin
- Other names: 3{[(4-cyclopentyl-1-piperazinyl)imino]methyl}rifamycin
- AHFS/Drugs.com: Monograph
- MedlinePlus: a616011
- License data: US DailyMed: Rifapentine
- Routes of administration: By mouth
- Drug class: Macrolactam
- ATC code: J04AB05 (WHO)

Legal status
- Legal status: CA: Urgent Public Health Need; US: ℞-only

Pharmacokinetic data
- Bioavailability: increases when administered with food

Identifiers
- IUPAC name: (7S,9E,11S,12R,13S,14R,15R,16R,17S,18S,19E,21Z,26E)-26-{[(4-cyclopentylpiperazin-1-yl)amino]methylidene}-2,15,17,29-tetrahydroxy-11-methoxy-3,7,12,14,16,18,22-heptamethyl-6,23,27-trioxo-8,30-dioxa-24-azatetracyclo[23.3.1.1^{4,7}.0^{5,28}]triaconta-1(28),2,4,9,19,21,25(29)-heptaen-13-yl acetate
- CAS Number: 61379-65-5
- PubChem CID: 6323497; 135403821
- DrugBank: DB01201
- ChemSpider: 10482075
- UNII: XJM390A33U
- KEGG: D00879; C08059
- ChEBI: CHEBI:45304
- ChEMBL: ChEMBL1660
- NIAID ChemDB: 007686
- PDB ligand: RPT (PDBe, RCSB PDB)
- CompTox Dashboard (EPA): DTXSID8041115
- ECHA InfoCard: 100.057.021

Chemical and physical data
- Formula: C_{47}H_{64}N_{4}O_{12}
- Molar mass: 877.045 g·mol^{−1}
- 3D model (JSmol): Interactive image
- Melting point: 179 to 180 °C (354 to 356 °F)
- SMILES: CC(=O)O[C@H]3[C@H](C)[C@H](O)[C@H](C)[C@@H](O)[C@@H](C)\C=C\C=C(\C)C(=O)Nc6c(/C=N/N1CCN(CC1)C2CCCC2)c(O)c5c4C(=O)[C@@](C)(O/C=C/[C@H](OC)[C@H]3C)Oc4c(C)c(O)c5c6O
- InChI: InChI=1S/C47H64N4O12/c1-24-13-12-14-25(2)46(59)49-37-32(23-48-51-20-18-50(19-21-51)31-15-10-11-16-31)41(56)34-35(42(37)57)40(55)29(6)44-36(34)45(58)47(8,63-44)61-22-17-33(60-9)26(3)43(62-30(7)52)28(5)39(54)27(4)38(24)53/h12-14,17,22-24,26-28,31,33,38-39,43,53-57H,10-11,15-16,18-21H2,1-9H3,(H,49,59)/b13-12+,22-17+,25-14-,48-23+/t24-,26+,27+,28+,33-,38-,39+,43+,47-/m0/s1; Key:WDZCUPBHRAEYDL-GZAUEHORSA-N

Rifapentine, sold under the brand name Priftin, is an antibiotic used in the treatment of tuberculosis. In active tuberculosis it is used together with other antituberculosis medications. In latent tuberculosis it is typically used with isoniazid. It is taken by mouth.

Common side effects include low neutrophil counts in the blood, elevated liver enzymes, and white blood cells in the urine. Serious side effects may include liver problems or Clostridioides difficile associated diarrhea. It is unclear if use during pregnancy is safe. Rifapentine is in the rifamycin family of medication and works by blocking DNA-dependent RNA polymerase.

Rifapentine was approved for medical use in the United States in 1998. It is on the World Health Organization's List of Essential Medicines.

== Medical uses ==
A systematic review of regimens for prevention of active tuberculosis in HIV-negative individuals with latent TB found that a weekly, directly observed regimen of rifapentine with isoniazid for three months was as effective as a daily, self-administered regimen of isoniazid for nine months. The three-month rifapentine-isoniazid regimen had higher rates of treatment completion and lower rates of hepatotoxicity. However, the rate of treatment-limiting adverse events was higher in the rifapentine-isoniazid regimen compared to the nine-month isoniazid regimen.

== Adverse effects ==
Common side effects include allergic reaction, anemia, neutropenia, elevated transaminases, and pyuria. Overdoses have been associated with hematuria and hyperuricemia.

=== Pregnancy ===
Rifapentine in pregnant women has not been studied, but animal reproduction studies have resulted in fetal harm and were teratogenic.

== Contraindications ==
Rifapentine should be avoided in patients with an allergy to the rifamycin class of drugs. This drug class includes rifampicin and rifabutin.

== Interactions ==
Rifapentine induces metabolism by CYP3A4, CYP2C8 and CYP2C9 enzymes. It may be necessary to adjust the dosage of drugs metabolized by these enzymes if they are taken with rifapentine. Examples of drugs that may be affected by rifapentine include warfarin, propranolol, digoxin, protease inhibitors and birth control pills.

== Chemical structure ==
The chemical structure of rifapentine is similar to that of rifampicin, with the notable substitution of a methyl group for a cyclopentane (C_{5}H_{9}) group.

== History ==
Rifapentine was first synthesized in 1965, by the same company that produced rifampicin. The drug was approved by the U.S. Food and Drug Administration (FDA) in June 1998. It is made from rifampicin.

Rifapentine was granted orphan drug designation by the FDA in June 1995, and by the European Commission in June 2010.

== Society and culture ==
=== Cancer-causing impurities ===
In August 2020, the U.S. Food and Drug Administration (FDA) became aware of nitrosamine impurities in certain samples of rifapentine. The FDA and manufacturers are investigating the origin of these impurities in rifapentine, and the agency is developing testing methods for regulators and industry to detect the 1-cyclopentyl-4-nitrosopiperazine (CPNP). CPNP belongs to the nitrosamine class of compounds, some of which are classified as probable or possible human carcinogens (substances that could cause cancer), based on laboratory tests such as rodent carcinogenicity studies. Although there are no data available to directly evaluate the carcinogenic potential of CPNP, information available on closely related nitrosamine compounds was used to calculate lifetime exposure limits for CPNP.

As of January 2021, the FDA continues to investigate the presence of 1-methyl-4-nitrosopiperazine (MNP) in rifampin or 1-cyclopentyl-4-nitrosopiperazine (CPNP) in rifapentine approved for sale in the US.
