= Naphthomycin A =

Identifiers
3D model (JSmol)	Interactive image
ChEBI	CHEBI:197824
ChEMBL	ChEMBL2172467
ChemSpider	8276911
PubChem CID	10101379
- InChI: InChI=1S/C40H46ClNO9/c1-20-11-9-8-10-12-23(4)40(51)42-34-33(41)39(50)31-28(38(34)49)18-26(7)37(48)32(31)36(47)25(6)17-24(5)35(46)22(3)14-16-27(43)15-13-21(2)30(45)19-29(20)44/h8-14,16-18,20,22,24,27,29,35,43-44,46,48H,15,19H2,1-7H3,(H,42,51)/b10-8-,11-9-,16-14-,21-13-,23-12-,25-17-/t20-,22-,24-,27-,29-,35-/m0/s1 Key: AXEGRHYJHHPVDH-GGBROUGNSA-N
- SMILES: O=C1c2c3C(=O)/C(=C1/Cl)NC(=O)/C(=C\C=C\C=C/[C@H](C)[C@@H](O)CC(=O)\C(=C/C[C@H](O)\C=C/[C@H](C)[C@H](O)[C@H](\C=C(\C(=O)c2c(O)c(c3)C)C)C)C)C

Properties
Chemical formula	C_{40}H_{46}ClNO_{9}
Molar mass	720.26 g·mol^{−1}
- Except where otherwise noted, data are given for materials in their standard state (at 25 °C [77 °F], 100 kPa). Infobox references

Naphthomycin A is a type of naphthomycin. It was isolated as a yellow pigment from Streptomyces collinus and it shows antibacterial, antifungal, and antitumor activities. Naphthomycins have the longest ansa aliphatic carbon chain of the ansamycin family. Biosynthetic origins of the carbon skeleton from PKS1 were investigated by feeding 13C-labeled precursors and subsequent 13C-NMR product analysis. Naphthomycin gene clusters have been cloned and sequenced to confirm involvement in biosynthesis via deletion of a 7.2kb region. Thirty-two genes were identified in the 106kb cluster.

The proposed naphthomycin biosynthetic pathway. A, adenylation; KS, ketosynthase; AT, acyltransferase; T, acyl carrier protein or peptidyl carrier protein; DH, dehydratase; KR, ketoreductase; (*) redundant domain.
