= ATCvet code QJ54 =

Veterinary medical products classification subgroup

ATCvet code QJ54 Antimycobacterials for intramammary use is a therapeutic subgroup of the Anatomical Therapeutic Chemical Classification System for veterinary medicinal products, a system of alphanumeric codes developed by the World Health Organization (WHO) for the classification of drugs and other medical products for veterinary use. Subgroup QJ54 is part of the anatomical group QJ Antiinfectives for systemic use.

National versions of the ATC classification may include additional codes not present in this list, which follows the WHO version.

== QJ54A Drugs for mycobacterial infections ==
=== QJ54AB Antibiotics ===
QJ54AB02 Rifampicin
QJ54AB03 Rifamycin
