= Cytotrienin A =

Names
- IUPAC name [(5R,6E,8E,10E,13S,14R,15R,16Z)-15,22,24-trihydroxy-5-methoxy-14,16-dimethyl-3-oxo-2-azabicyclo[18.3.1]tetracosa-1(23),6,8,10,16,20(24),21-heptaen-13-yl] 1-(cyclohexene-1-carbonylamino)cyclopropane-1-carboxylate

Identifiers
CAS Number	189010-85-3
3D model (JSmol)	Interactive image
ChEBI	CHEBI:65720
ChemSpider	10140092
MeSH	C106761
PubChem CID	11966097
- InChI: InChI=1S/C37H48N2O8/c1-24-13-12-16-27-21-28(40)22-30(34(27)43)38-32(41)23-29(46-3)17-10-5-4-6-11-18-31(25(2)33(24)42)47-36(45)37(19-20-37)39-35(44)26-14-8-7-9-15-26/h4-6,10-11,13-14,17,21-22,25,29,31,33,40,42-43H,7-9,12,15-16,18-20,23H2,1-3H3,(H,38,41)(H,39,44)/b5-4+,11-6+,17-10+,24-13-/t25-,29-,31-,33-/m0/s1 Key: HNVKTRONBDHSPT-QETCNUOWSA-N
- SMILES: CC1C(CC=CC=CC=CC(CC(=O)NC2=CC(=CC(=C2O)CCC=C(C1O)C)O)OC)OC(=O)C3(CC3)NC(=O)C4=CCCCC4

Properties
Chemical formula	C_{37}H_{48}N_{2}O_{8}
Molar mass	648.797 g·mol^{−1}
- Except where otherwise noted, data are given for materials in their standard state (at 25 °C [77 °F], 100 kPa). Infobox references

Cytotrienin A (Cyt A) is a secondary metabolite isolated from Streptomyces sp. RK95-74 isolated from soil in Japan in 1997. Cyt A is an ansamycin. Cytotrienin A induces apoptosis on HL-60 cells, as well as inhibiting translation in eukaryotes by inhibiting eukaryotic elongation factor 1A (eEF1A), which can act as an oncogene. These functions lead to the potential of the microbial metabolite acting as an anticancer agent, specifically for blood cancers, as it has proved to be more effective with leukemic cell lines. Cyt A is thought to induce apoptosis by activating c-Jun N-terminal Kinase (JNK), p38 mitogen-activated protein kinase (MAPK), and p36 myelin basic protein (MBP) kinase.

== Structure ==
Cytotrienin A is an ansamycin with a macrocyclic, twenty-one carbon, lactam, featuring an E,E,E-triene and an unusual aminocyclopropane carboxylic acid side chain. The structure features four stereocenters, 3 of which are contiguous. The absolute stereochemistry of the naturally occurring metabolite revealed it to be (+)-Cytotrienin A.

== Biology and Biochemistry ==
Cytotrienin A has a median effective dose value of 7.7 nM to induce apoptosis on HL-60 cells. It was also shown that the metabolite has greater growth inhibitory activity on HL-60 cells at low concentrations and little impact on non-tumorous cells, while at high concentrations the reverse relationship was seen. The apoptosis pathway was shown to involve the proteolytic activation of MST/Krs proteins by caspase-3 which results in the activation of p36 MBP kinase through the creation of ROS. The concentrations needed to induce this pathway were found to be the same required to induce apoptosis on HL-60 cells. Cyt A also activates c-Jun N-terminal kinase, and its apoptotic effects are inhibited by dominant negative c-Jun. While the presence of inactive MST/Krs proteins and dominant negative c-Jun completely inhibited apoptosis.

Additionally, cytotrienin A acts to inhibit eEF-1A, and thus inhibiting translation. This can make the tumor less effective at producing anti-apoptotic mediators and lowering the tumor's drug resistance. The translation inhibition is thought to occur before apoptosis can be detected. Inhibition of HUVEC tube formation was also shown, which indicates an inhibition of angiogenesis and further evidence of its anti-cancer potential. In A549 cells, where cytotrienin A has been shown to be less effective, cyt A inhibits the expression of ICAM-1. This occurs when the TNF receptor 1 is shredded through the activation of extracellular signal-regulated kinase (ERK) and p38 MAPK. Cyt A inhibited ICAM-1 expression by TNF-α and IL-1α at similar concentrations, but was found to be inhibited by TAPI-2, an inhibitor to the TNF-α-converting enzyme (TACE).
