= Hazards of outdoor recreation =

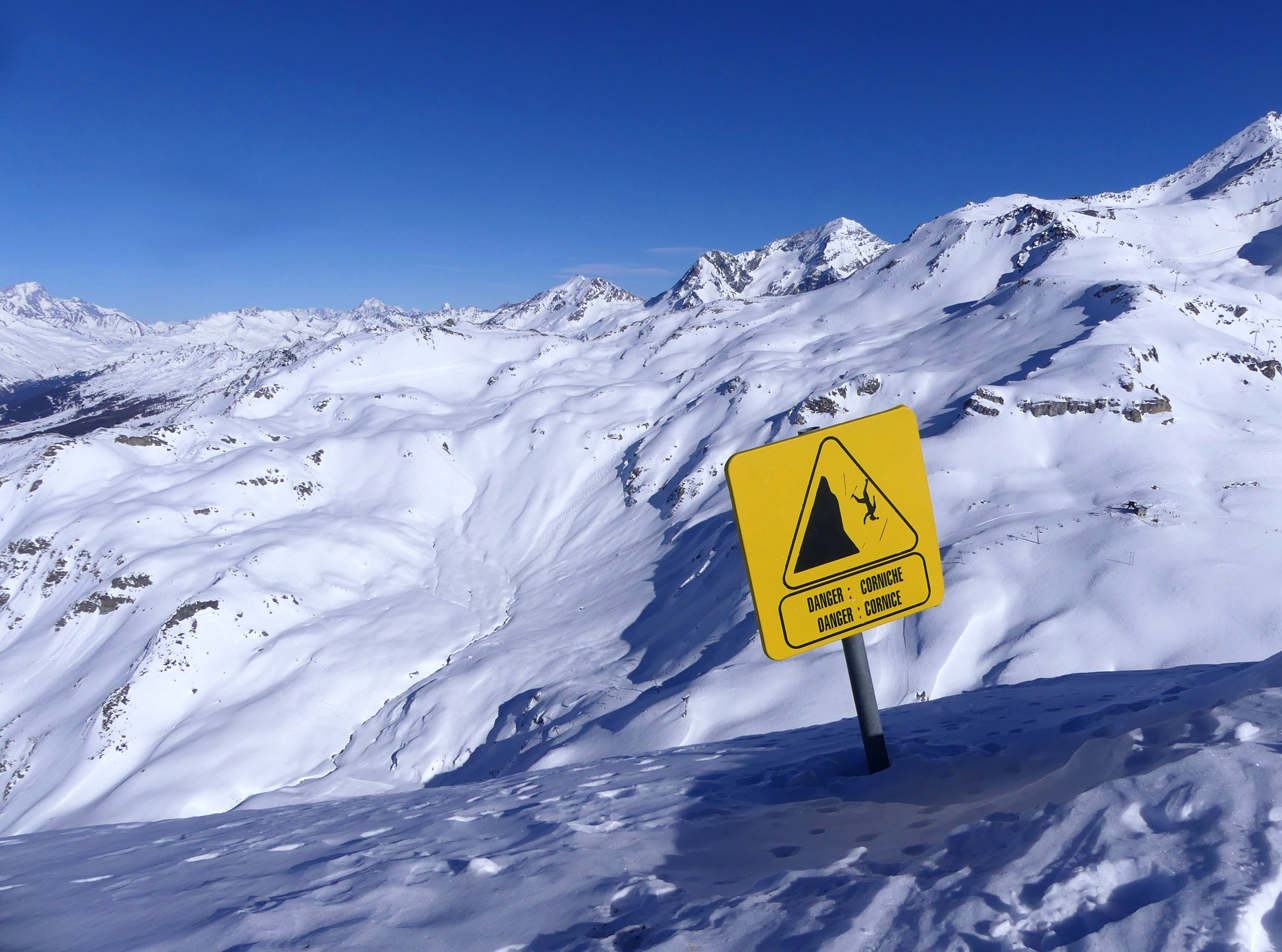
Warning sign on Vanoise Massif, France

Outdoor recreation, such as hiking, camping, canoeing, cycling, or skiing, entails risks, even if participants do not recklessly place themselves in harm's way. In some circumstances, such as being in remote locations or in extreme weather conditions, even a minor accident may create a dangerous situation that requires survival skills. However, with correct precautions, even fairly adventurous outdoor recreation can be enjoyable and safe.

== General safety measures ==
Every hazard has its own safety measure, and every ailment a particular remedy. A standard precaution for all back country activities is carrying the "ten essentials", a collection of tools chosen for their utility in preventing or reacting to various emergencies.

The common practice of traveling in a group improves safety in all regards. If one person is injured, group members can administer first aid or seek help. A group can avoid poor decisions that a lone traveler might make. If an emergency occurs, a group can pool its muscle power, brain power, and body heat.

Another precaution is informing people outside of the group of the itinerary and expected return time (expected hiking time can be estimated using Naismith's rule). A communication device, such as a cell phone or a satellite phone, may help in the case of an emergency. However, with the exception of mountain tops that are in line-of-sight to populated areas, cell phone coverage in wilderness areas is often quite poor. In the wilderness one should always be prepared to hike out for help, if necessary.

== Dangerous circumstances ==
=== Inclement weather ===
Blizzards, flash floods, fog, dust or sandstorms, tornadoes, and other meteorological events may or may not be predictable, and may require immediate response for survival. Lightning is a frequent and serious threat in many regions.

=== Hazardous terrain ===
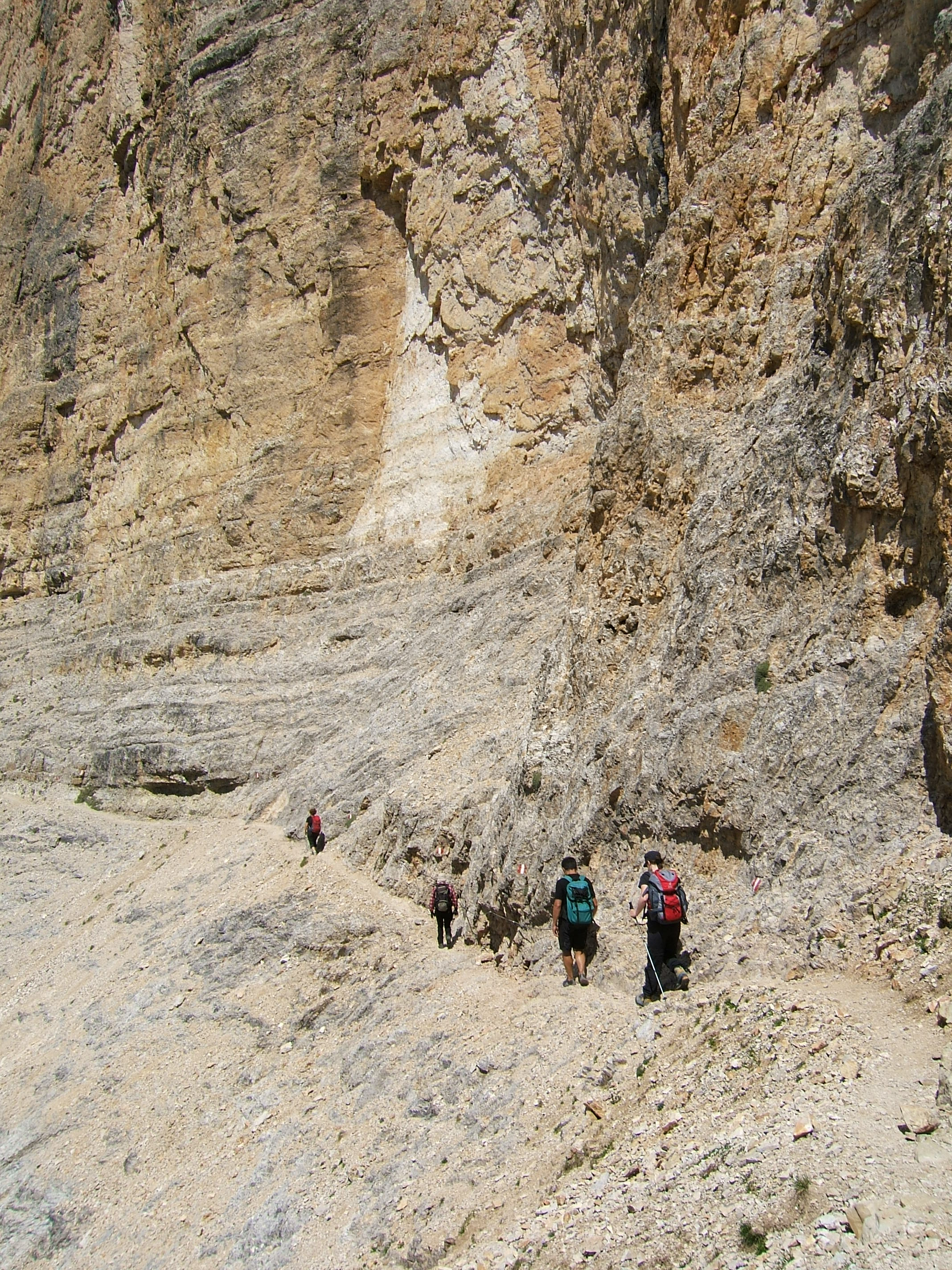
A crossing of the west flank of the Heiligkreuzkofel, South Tyrol requires a head for heights and sure-footedness in several places.

Backcountry avalanches are generally triggered by the immediate action of the party. Precautions include training, monitoring weather conditions to learn the history of the snow pack, digging hasty pits, modifying the route, passing one-by-one through dangerous areas, wearing avalanche beacons, and carrying avalanche probes and snow shovels. Other non-avalanche snow immersions can be similarly dangerous, including tree wells.

Other mass movements include icefalls, landslides, and rockfalls. When choosing a campsite care must be taken to avoid those along with dead trees, snags, trees with large dead branches, or trees that have previously been through a forest fire. Collectively, these are called "widowmakers" by experienced campers.

Slips may occur:

- On wet rocks or logs.
- When crossing streams, rivers, lakes, and other bodies of water, which can be dangerous due to poor visibility, uneven surfaces, smooth and algae or moss-covered rocks, and strong currents. The tops of waterfalls are especially dangerous because of fast moving water and smooth, slanted rocks. Rubber soles grip poorly on slime, compared to felt soles, crampons, or hob-nailed boots. Precautions include being aware of the danger, using hiking poles, loosening packs straps to lower gravity and in case of becoming submerged, and crossing with other people linked arm to arm or using a rope.
- Because of loose material. Loose gravel or scree on top of smooth rock acts like ball bearings. Precautions include spotting the situation ahead, keeping knees bent and weight forward, using hiking sticks, and brushing aside the gravel where possible.
- Ice

When travelling over glaciers, crevasses pose a grave danger. These giant cracks in the ice are not always visible, as snow can be blown and freeze over the top to make a snowbridge. At times snowbridges can be as thin as a few inches. Climbers and hikers use ropes to protect themselves from such hazards. Basic gear for glacier travel includes crampons and ice axes, and teams of two to five tie into a rope equally spaced. If someone begins to fall the other members of the team perform a self-arrest to stop the fall and then attempt a rescue.

Drownings are especially likely when accompanied by head injuries (which may render people unconscious), in very cold water (which can sap energy quickly), or in white water (which may be so frothy that it is impossible to float, or even swim, to the surface).

When walking beaches or crossing estuaries, it is essential to be aware of the tides.

=== Losing the way ===
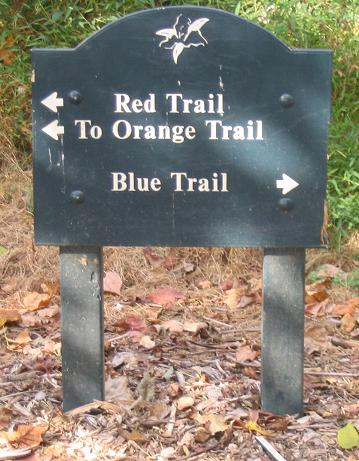
In some parks, hiking trails are clearly and accurately labeled.

Travelers may become lost, either if a group cannot find its way or if an individual becomes separated from the party and cannot find it again. Lost hikers who cannot find their way to their destination on time may run out of food and water, or experience a change in weather. The absence of clearly marked trails increases the risk of losing one's way.

If a group splits up into several subgroups moving at different speeds, one of the subgroups may take a wrong turn at a trail junction. A common procedure to avoid this is for the leaders to stop at junctions and wait for the others. Keeping the group together is important in the wilderness, especially when visibility is blocked due to weather, rocks, or trees.

Carrying a map and compass, and knowing how to use them, will decrease the risk of getting lost. Likewise, a Global Positioning System may prove invaluable, as it can pinpoint a traveler's location, revealing his exact position and the direction to roads, services, and inhabited areas. Most GPS devices can also be designed to mark one's path on a map, making it easy to backtrack. Family Radio Service, General Mobile Radio Service, and amateur radios operating on the "2 meters" band may help maintain communication. Flashing lights, signal mirrors, and whistles are low-tech emergency signals.

Without a distant focal point, such as a mountain top, or the sun or moon, people who are lost can sometimes wander in circles.

== Specific accidents and ailments ==
=== Metabolic imbalances ===
Metabolic imbalances can affect general functioning and lead to other injuries.

- Dehydration can rapidly incapacitate an adventurer, especially in warm weather. In conditions of low humidity, sweat evaporates so quickly that a person may not notice the water loss. Carrying and drinking an adequate amount of water helps avoid dehydration. Depending on conditions, two liters of water may be enough for a day hike, but under hot conditions (such as hiking the Grand Canyon in summer), one liter per hour may be required. Naturally occurring water is often unfit to drink (see Potability of backcountry water).
- Sweating removes not only water, but also salt. This may result in a deficiency of sodium (hyponatremia). Eating salty snacks together with drinking water helps to avoid this problem.
- If deprived of food for several days, travelers may become malnourished. Malnutrition takes several weeks to kill a person, but because it impairs judgment, it can cause problems much sooner. Low blood sugar may have a similar effect, especially for those with diabetes. Carrying extra food will minimize risk to the hiker.
- Hypothermia is a potentially fatal drop in core body temperature. It occurs most easily in cold weather and when wet. Wet or damp clothing (due to rain, sweat, stream crossings, etc.) can bring it on even in relatively warm air, particularly at high elevation, windy conditions, or at low humidity. Even if hypothermia does not kill the victim directly it causes confusion, irrationality and impaired judgment, increasing the risk of other injuries. Sufficient clothing helps prevent hypothermia, but some materials (especially cotton) are discouraged because they absorb and hold water.
- Heat exhaustion, possibly developing into heatstroke, can occur in hot weather, particularly if one is dehydrated or dressed too warmly. The risk of heatstroke can be minimized by avoiding direct sun, and staying wet when possible. This is a life-threatening condition: a victim must be cooled off and transported to a hospital immediately.
- Altitude sickness results from climbing rapidly to elevations beyond 2,500 metres (approximately 8,000 feet). The process of acclimatization generally takes several days, but may be helped by drugs, such as Diamox. Acute mountain sickness (AMS) may develop into high altitude pulmonary edema (HAPE) or high altitude cerebral edema (HACE), both of which are life-threatening and require immediate transportation to a lower altitude.
- Carbon monoxide poisoning may occur in tents, igloos, cabins, or trailers due to faulty or misused equipment. It may also occur near the exhausts of motorboats, where the CO concentrations can be high enough to be quickly fatal.

=== Common injuries ===
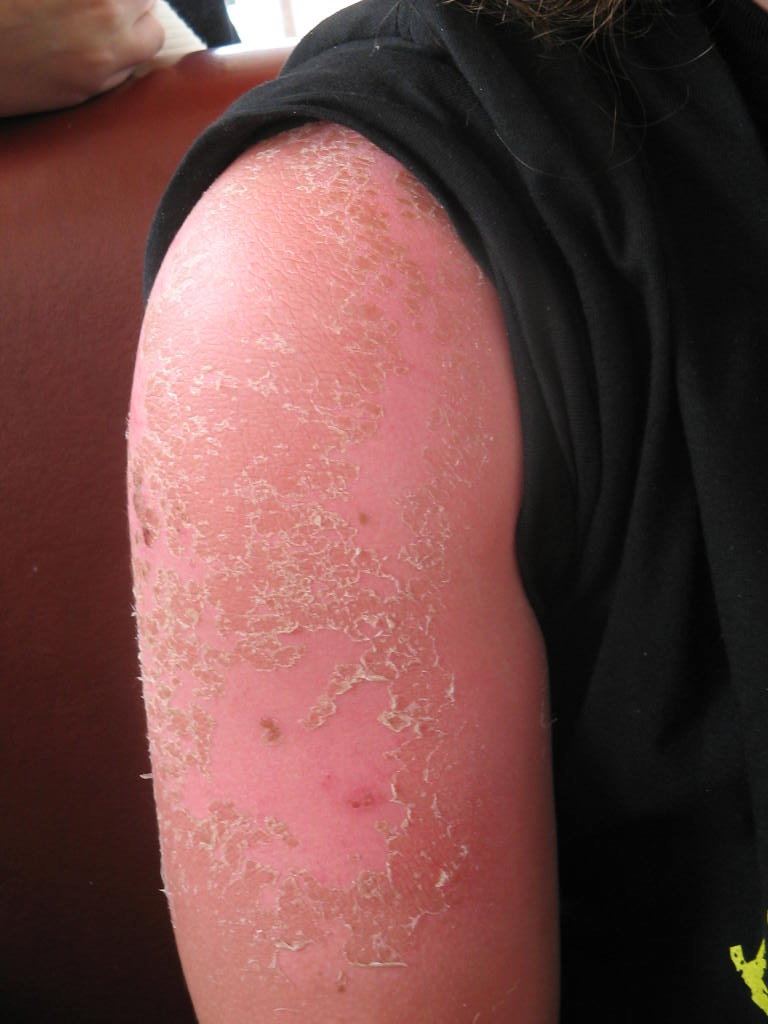
Overexposure to sunlight can result in sunburn.

- Ankle sprain makes up 42% of all hiking injuries. Sprain risk can be reduced by wearing boots with ankle protection.
- Frostbite can occur when bare skin is exposed to very low temperatures. Frostbite can be prevented by adequate clothing.
- Sunburn, which may occur in hot or cold conditions, can be debilitating. Sunburn may be prevented by wearing adequate sunscreen.
- Snow blindness, a burning of the cornea, is caused by the intense ultraviolet solar radiation multiplied by sunlit snow. Snow blindness may be prevented by wearing dark sunglasses or goggles.
- Burns can occur when dealing with camp stoves. Boiling pots are overturned, clogged fuel lines explode, hot metal is touched with bare skin. Burns are also caused by campfires, cookfires and bonfires.
- Lacerations may be caused by careless use of knives or axes, or contact with sharp rocks or barbed wire. Tetanus and other infections can result.
- Poisonous plants, such as poison ivy or stinging nettle (see list), cause rashes.
- Plant thorns and animal quills can cause deep puncture wounds, and can be difficult to remove, often requiring pliers.
- Foot blisters are caused by friction and irritation of the skin. Wet socks and poorly fitting shoes precipitate the occurrence of blisters.
- Other injuries due to falls: cumbersome backpacks increase the risk of missteps and falls, particularly on difficult terrain.

=== Animals ===
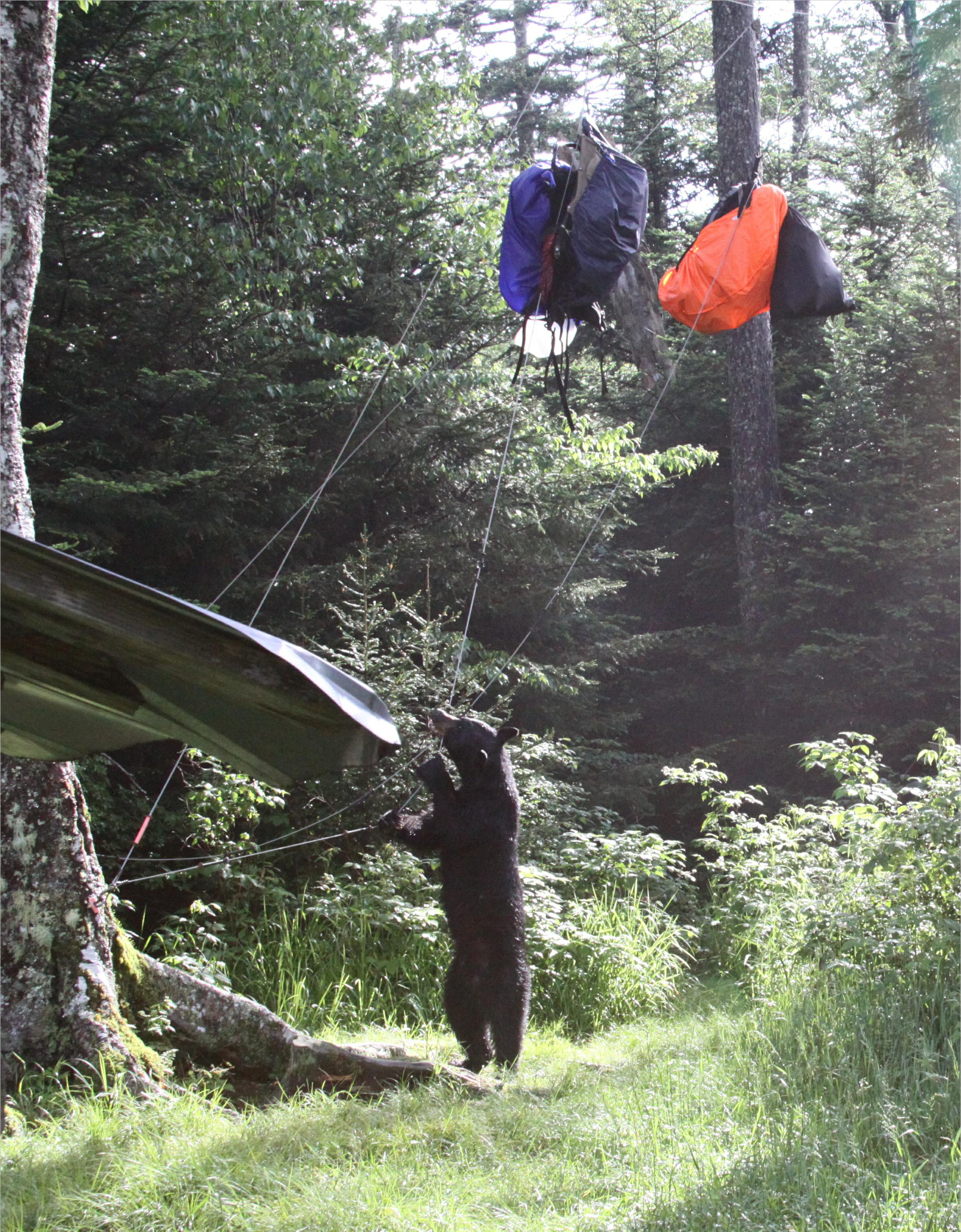
Harmful encounters between animals and people can occur when animals try to get human food. Above a Black Bear is unsuccessful getting into backpacks because they are hung out of reach. Proper food storage protects both people and animals.

In many areas, adventurers may encounter large predatory animals such as bears or cougars. These animals rarely seek out humans as food, but they will attack under some conditions. Some hazardous encounters occur when animals raid human property for food. Additionally, if travelers come upon an unsuspecting animal and surprise it, it may attack. Regularly making loud noise, such as by clapping or yelling, reduces the risk of surprising an animal. Some people use bear bells as noisemakers, but these are usually too quiet to be heard from far away. Any mammal infected with rabies may behave unexpectedly, even aggressively, and could infect a human with rabies by biting.

Venomous animals, including snakes, scorpions, spiders and bees, may cause harm either directly or through anaphylactic shock. Overall, the greatest danger is often from insects, such as mosquitoes, ticks and fleas, which carry communicable diseases.

=== Digestive infections ===
Surface water in the wilderness can contain viruses, bacteria or parasites. The latter two can cause dysentery or wilderness diarrhea in untreated water and can be spread person-to-person by poor hygiene in camp. The most common cause of wilderness diarrhea is the parasite Giardia.

=== Mental health ===
Whilst outdoors recreation is generally supportive, alterations to normal routines and the stresses associated with travel and new physical challenges can trigger pre-existing mental health conditions. Preventive measures include ensuring adequate social support, sufficient sleep, establishing travel-specific routines, adhering to medication regimens, and maintaining good awareness of early warning signs of mental health deterioration.

=== Air Quality ===
While staying outdoors recreation is typically associated health advantages, environmental factors such as air pollution can offset the health gains from physical activity. Specifically, high levels of PM2.5 tend to undercut the benefits of physical activity, neutralizing the protection that physical activity offers against long-term health risks. A 2025 study reveals the interaction between PM2.5 exposure and the protective benefits of physical activity. In a clean environment, getting enough exercise can slash your mortality risk by 30%. However, once PM2.5 concentrations cross the 25 ug/m^3 mark, that protective edge starts to fade, dropping the risk reduction to approximately between 12% and 15%.

== See also ==
- Hazards of mountaineering
- Hazards in the Rocky Mountains
