= Streptomyces collinus =

Scientific classification
- Domain: Bacteria
- Kingdom: Bacillati
- Phylum: Actinomycetota
- Class: Actinomycetes
- Order: Streptomycetales
- Family: Streptomycetaceae
- Genus: Streptomyces
- Species: S. collinus

Binomial name
- Streptomyces collinus Lindenbein 1952

Type strain
- AS 4.1623, ATCC 19743, BCRC 11465, CBS 482.68, CCRC 11465, CCT 4835, CGMCC 4.1623, DSM 2012, DSM 40129, ETH 24318, ICMP 12539, IFO 12759, ISP 5129, IST 301, JCM 4361, KCC S-0351, KCC S-0361, KCTC 9713, NBRC 12759, NRRL B-5412, NRRL-ISP 5129, RIA 1024, UNIQEM 130, VKM Ac-710

Species of bacterium

Streptomyces collinus is a bacterium species from the genus of Streptomyces which has been isolated from soil in Baden in Germany. Streptomyces collinus produces ansatrienin A2, ansatrienin A3, ansatrienin B, naphthomycin A, collinomycine, toromycin, streptocollin, kirromycin and rubromycine.

== See also ==
- List of Streptomyces species
