= Naphthomycin =

Class of chemical compounds

Naphthomycins are a group of closely related antimicrobial chemical compounds isolated from Streptomyces. They are considered a subclass of ansamycins.

Members include:

- Naphthomycin A
- Naphthomycin B
- Naphthomycin C
- Naphthomycin D
- Naphthomycin E
- Naphthomycin F
- Naphthomycin G
- Naphthomycin H
- Naphthomycin I
- Naphthomycin J
- Naphthomycin K
- Naphthomycin L
- Naphthomycin M
- Naphthomycin N

== Chemical structures ==
Naphthomycin A

Naphthomycin B

Naphthomycin C

Naphthomycin D

Naphthomycin E

Naphthomycin F

Naphthomycin G
