= Streptovaricin =

Group of chemical compounds

Chemical structure of streptovaricin A

Streptovaricins are a group of structurally related macrolide antibiotics. They belong to the larger class of antibiotics known as ansamycins.
