= Travelers' diarrhea =

Stomach and intestinal infection

- Other names: Travellers' diarrhea, tourist diarrhea, traveler's dysentery, Delhi belly, Montezuma's revenge
- The bacterium E. coli, the most common cause of Travelers' diarrhea
- Specialty: Infectious diseases
- Symptoms: Unformed stool while traveling, fever, abdominal cramps, headache
- Duration: Typically < 5 days
- Causes: Often bacterial
- Risk factors: Travel in the developing world
- Diagnostic method: Based on symptoms and travel history
- Prevention: Eating only properly prepared food, drinking bottled water, frequent hand washing
- Treatment: Oral rehydration therapy, antibiotics, loperamide
- Frequency: ~35% of travelers to the developing world

Travelers' diarrhea (TD) is a stomach and intestinal infection experienced during travel to a new location as a result of lack of immunity to local food-borne pathogens. TD is defined as the passage of unformed stool (one or more by some definitions, three or more by others) while traveling. It may be accompanied by abdominal cramps, nausea, fever, headache, and bloating. Occasionally dysentery may occur. Most travelers recover within three to four days with little or no treatment. About 12% of people may have symptoms for a week.

Bacteria are responsible for more than half of cases, typically via foodborne illness and waterborne diseases. The bacteria enterotoxigenic Escherichia coli (ETEC) are typically the most common except in Southeast Asia, where Campylobacter is more prominent. About 10 to 20 percent of cases are due to norovirus. Protozoa such as Giardia may cause longer-term disease. The risk is greatest in the first two weeks of travel and among young adults. People affected are more often from the developed world.

Recommendations for prevention include eating only properly cleaned and cooked food, drinking bottled water, and frequent hand washing. The oral cholera vaccine, while effective for cholera, is of questionable use for travelers' diarrhea. Preventive antibiotics are generally discouraged. Primary treatment includes rehydration and replacing lost salts (oral rehydration therapy). Antibiotics are recommended for significant or persistent symptoms, and can be taken with loperamide to decrease diarrhea. Hospitalization is required in less than 3 percent of cases.

Estimates of the percentage of people affected range from 20 to 50 percent among travelers to the developing world. TD is particularly common among people traveling to parts of Asia, Africa, and Latin America. In Southern and Eastern Europe, the risk is moderate. TD has been linked to later irritable bowel syndrome and Guillain–Barré syndrome. It has colloquially been known by a number of names, including "Montezuma's revenge", "Turkey trots", "Bali belly" and "Delhi belly".

== Signs and symptoms ==
The onset of TD usually occurs within the first week of travel, but may occur at any time while traveling, and even after returning home, depending on the incubation period of the infectious agent. Bacterial TD typically begins abruptly, but Cryptosporidium may incubate for seven days, and Giardia for 14 days or more, before symptoms develop. Typically, a traveler experiences four to five loose or watery bowel movements each day. Other commonly associated symptoms are abdominal cramping, bloating, fever, and malaise. Appetite may decrease significantly. Though unpleasant, most cases of TD are mild and resolve in a few days without medical intervention.

Blood or mucus in the diarrhea, significant abdominal pain, or high fever suggests a more serious cause, such as cholera, characterized by a rapid onset of weakness and torrents of watery diarrhea with flecks of mucus (described as "rice water" stools). Medical care should be sought in such cases; dehydration is a serious consequence of cholera, and may trigger serious sequelae—including, in rare instances, death—as rapidly as 24 hours after onset if not addressed promptly.

== Causes ==
E. coli, enterotoxigenic	20–75%
E. coli, enteroaggregative	0–20%
E. coli, enteroinvasive	0–6%
Shigella spp.	2–30%
Salmonella spp.	0–33%
Campylobacter jejuni	3–17%
Vibrio parahaemolyticus	0–31%
Aeromonas hydrophila	0–30%
Giardia lamblia	0–20%
Entamoeba histolytica	0–5%
Cryptosporidium spp.	0–20%
Cyclospora cayetanensis	?
Rotavirus	0–36%
Norovirus	0–10%

Infectious agents are the primary cause of travelers' diarrhea. Bacterial enteropathogens cause about 80% of cases. Viruses and protozoans account for most of the rest.

The most common causative agent isolated in countries surveyed has been enterotoxigenic Escherichia coli (ETEC). Enteroaggregative E. coli is increasingly recognized. Shigella spp. and Salmonella spp. are other common bacterial pathogens. Campylobacter, Yersinia, Aeromonas, and Plesiomonas spp. are less frequently found. Mechanisms of action vary: some bacteria release toxins which bind to the intestinal wall and cause diarrhea; others damage the intestines themselves by their direct presence.

Brachyspira pilosicoli pathogen also appears to be responsible for many chronic intermittent watery diarrhea and is only diagnosed through colonic biopsies and microscopic discovery of a false brush border on H&E or Warthin silver stain: its brush-border is stronger and longer that Brachyspira aalborgi's brush-border. It is unfortunately often not diagnosed as coproculture does not allow growth and 16S PCR panel primers do not match Brachyspira sequences.

While viruses cause less than 20% of adult cases of travelers' diarrhea, they may cause nearly 70% of cases in infants and children. Diarrhea due to viral agents is unaffected by antibiotic therapy, but is usually self-limited. Protozoans such as Giardia lamblia, Cryptosporidium and Cyclospora cayetanensis can also cause diarrhea. Pathogens commonly implicated in travelers' diarrhea appear in the table in this section.

A subtype of travelers' diarrhea afflicting hikers and campers, sometimes known as wilderness diarrhea, may have a somewhat different frequency of distribution of pathogens.

=== Risk factors ===
The primary source of infection is ingestion of fecally contaminated food or water. Attack rates are similar for men and women.

The most important determinant of risk is the traveler's destination. High-risk destinations include developing countries in Latin America, Africa, the Middle East, and Asia. Among backpackers, additional risk factors include drinking untreated surface water and failure to maintain personal hygiene practices and clean cookware. Campsites often have very primitive (if any) sanitation facilities, making them potentially as dangerous as any developing country.

Although travelers' diarrhea usually resolves within three to five days (mean duration: 3.6 days), in about 20% of cases, the illness is severe enough to require bedrest, and in 10%, the illness duration exceeds one week. For those prone to serious infections, such as bacillary dysentery, amoebic dysentery, and cholera, TD can occasionally be life-threatening. Others at higher-than-average risk include young adults, immunosuppressed persons, persons with inflammatory bowel disease or diabetes, and those taking H2 blockers or antacids.

=== Immunity ===
Travelers often get diarrhea from eating and drinking foods and beverages that have no adverse effects on local residents. This is due to immunity that develops with constant, repeated exposure to pathogenic organisms. The extent and duration of exposure necessary to acquire immunity has not been determined; it may vary with each individual organism. A study among expatriates in Nepal suggests that immunity may take up to seven years to develop—presumably in adults who avoid deliberate pathogen exposure. Conversely, immunity acquired by American students while living in Mexico disappeared, in one study, as quickly as eight weeks after cessation of exposure.

== Prevention ==
=== Sanitation ===
Recommendations include avoidance of questionable foods and drinks, on the assumption that TD is fundamentally a sanitation failure, leading to bacterial contamination of drinking water and food. While the effectiveness of this strategy has been questioned, given that travelers have little or no control over sanitation in hotels and restaurants, and little evidence supports the contention that food vigilance reduces the risk of contracting TD, guidelines continue to recommend basic, common-sense precautions when making food and beverage choices:

- Maintain good hygiene and use only safe water for drinking and brushing teeth.
- Safe beverages include bottled water, bottled carbonated beverages, and water boiled or appropriately treated by the traveler (as described below). Caution should be exercised with tea, coffee, and other hot beverages that may be only heated, not boiled.
- In restaurants, insist that bottled water be unsealed in your presence; reports of locals filling empty bottles with untreated tap water and reselling them as purified water are common. When in doubt, bottled carbonated water or beverages are the safest choice, since it is difficult to simulate carbonation when refilling a used bottle.
- Avoid using ice in drinks, which may not have been made with safe water.
- Avoid green salads, because the lettuce and other uncooked ingredients are unlikely to have been washed with safe water.
- Avoid eating raw fruits and vegetables unless thoroughly cleaned and peeled personally.

If handled properly, thoroughly cooked fresh and packaged foods are usually safe. Raw or undercooked meat and seafood should be avoided. Unpasteurized milk, dairy products, mayonnaise, and pastry icing are associated with increased risk for TD, as are foods and beverages purchased from street vendors and other establishments where unhygienic conditions may be present.

=== Water ===
Although safe bottled water is now widely available in most remote destinations, travelers can treat their own water if necessary, or as an extra precaution. Techniques include boiling, filtering, chemical treatment, and ultraviolet light; boiling is by far the most effective of these methods. Boiling rapidly kills all active bacteria, viruses, and protozoa. Prolonged boiling is usually unnecessary; most microorganisms are killed within seconds at water temperature above 55–70 °C (131–158 °F). The second-most effective method is to combine filtration and chemical disinfection. Filters eliminate most bacteria and protozoa, but not viruses. Chemical treatment with halogens—chlorine bleach, tincture of iodine, or commercial tablets—has low-to-moderate effectiveness against protozoa such as Giardia, but work well against bacteria and viruses. UV light is effective against both viruses and cellular organisms, but only works in clear water, and it is ineffective unless manufacturer's instructions are carefully followed for maximum water depth/distance from UV source, and for dose/exposure time. Other claimed advantages include short treatment time, elimination of the need for boiling, no taste alteration, and decreased long-term cost compared with bottled water. The effectiveness of UV devices is reduced when water is muddy or turbid; as UV is a type of light, any suspended particles create shadows that hide microorganisms from UV exposure.

=== Medications ===
Bismuth subsalicylate four times daily reduces rates of travelers' diarrhea. Though many travelers find a four-times-per-day regimen inconvenient, lower doses are not effective. Potential side effects include black tongue, black stools, nausea, constipation, and ringing in the ears. Bismuth subsalicylate should not be taken by those with aspirin allergy, kidney disease, or gout, nor concurrently with certain antibiotics such as the quinolones, and should not be taken continuously for more than three weeks. Some countries do not recommend it due to the risk of rare but serious side effects.

A hyperimmune bovine colostrum to be taken by mouth is marketed in Australia for prevention of ETEC-induced TD. As yet, no studies show efficacy under actual travel conditions.

Though effective, antibiotics are not recommended for the prevention of TD in most situations because of the risk of allergy or adverse reactions to the antibiotics, and because intake of preventive antibiotics may decrease the effectiveness of such drugs should a serious infection develop subsequently. Antibiotics can also cause vaginal yeast infections, or overgrowth of the bacterium Clostridioides difficile, leading to pseudomembranous colitis and its associated severe, unrelenting diarrhea.

Antibiotics may be warranted in special situations where benefits outweigh the above risks, such as immunocompromised travelers, chronic intestinal disorders, prior history of repeated disabling bouts of TD, or scenarios in which the onset of diarrhea might prove particularly troublesome. Options for prophylactic treatment include the fluoroquinolone antibiotics (such as ciprofloxacin), azithromycin, and trimethoprim/sulfamethoxazole, though the latter has proved less effective in recent years. Rifaximin may also be useful. Quinolone antibiotics may bind to metallic cations such as bismuth, and should not be taken concurrently with bismuth subsalicylate. Trimethoprim/sulfamethoxazole should not be taken by anyone with a history of sulfa allergy.

=== Vaccination ===
The oral cholera vaccine, while effective for prevention of cholera, is of questionable use for prevention of TD. A 2008 review found tentative evidence of benefit. A 2015 review stated it may be reasonable for those at high risk of complications from TD. Several vaccine candidates targeting ETEC or Shigella are in various stages of development.

=== Probiotics ===
One 2007 review found that probiotics may be safe and effective for prevention of TD, while another review found no benefit. A 2009 review confirmed that more study is needed, as the evidence to date is mixed.

=== Others ===
Sodium butyrate has been found to be effective in the prevention of traveler's diarrhea.

== Treatment ==
Most cases of TD are mild and resolve in a few days without treatment, but severe or protracted cases may result in significant fluid loss and dangerous electrolytic imbalance. Dehydration due to diarrhea can also alter the effectiveness of medicinal and contraceptive drugs. Adequate fluid intake (oral rehydration therapy) is therefore a high priority. Commercial rehydration drinks are widely available; alternatively, purified water or other clear liquids are recommended, along with salty crackers or oral rehydration salts (available in stores and pharmacies in most countries) to replenish lost electrolytes. Carbonated water or soda, left open to allow dissipation of the carbonation, is useful when nothing else is available. In severe or protracted cases, the oversight of a medical professional is advised.

=== Antibiotics ===
If diarrhea becomes severe (typically defined as three or more loose stools in an eight-hour period), especially if associated with nausea, vomiting, abdominal cramps, fever, or blood in stools, medical treatment should be sought. Such patients may benefit from antimicrobial therapy. A 2000 literature review found that antibiotic treatment shortens the duration and severity of TD; most reported side effects were minor, or resolved on stopping the antibiotic.

The antibiotic recommended varies based upon the destination of travel. Trimethoprim–sulfamethoxazole and doxycycline are no longer recommended because of high levels of resistance to these agents. Antibiotics are typically given for three to five days, but single doses of azithromycin or levofloxacin have been used. Rifaximin and rifamycin are approved in the U.S. for treatment of TD caused by ETEC. If diarrhea persists despite therapy, travelers should be evaluated for bacterial strains resistant to the prescribed antibiotic, possible viral or parasitic infections, bacterial or amoebic dysentery, Giardia, helminths, or cholera.

=== Antimotility agents ===
Antimotility drugs such as loperamide and diphenoxylate reduce the symptoms of diarrhea by slowing transit time in the gut. They may be taken to slow the frequency of stools, but not enough to stop bowel movements completely, which delays expulsion of the causative organisms from the intestines. They should be avoided in patients with fever, bloody diarrhea, and possible inflammatory diarrhea. Adverse reactions may include nausea, vomiting, abdominal pain, hives or rash, and loss of appetite. Antimotility agents should not, as a rule, be taken by children under age two.

== Epidemiology ==
An estimated 10 million people—20 to 50% of international travelers—develop TD each year. It is more common in the developing world, where rates exceed 60%, but has been reported in some form in virtually every travel destination in the world.

== Society and culture ==
Moctezuma's revenge is a colloquial term for travelers' diarrhea contracted in Mexico. The name refers to Moctezuma II (1466–1520), the Tlatoani (ruler) of the Aztec civilization who was overthrown by the Spanish conquistador Hernán Cortés in the early 16th century, thereby bringing large portions of what is now Mexico and Central America under the rule of the Spanish crown. The relevance being that Cortés and his soldiers carried the smallpox virus, to which Mexicans had never been exposed. The resulting infection reduced the population of Tenochtitlan by 40 percent in 1520 alone.

== Wilderness diarrhea ==
Wilderness diarrhea, also called wilderness-acquired diarrhea (WAD) or backcountry diarrhea, refers to diarrhea among backpackers, hikers, campers and other outdoor recreationalists in wilderness or backcountry situations, either at home or abroad. It is caused by the same fecal microorganisms as other forms of travelers' diarrhea, usually bacterial or viral. Since wilderness campsites seldom provide access to sanitation facilities, the infection risk is similar to that of any developing country. Water treatment, good hygiene, and dish washing have all been shown to reduce the incidence of WAD.
