= Wilderness-acquired diarrhea =

- Other names: wilderness diarrhea, or backcountry diarrhea

Wilderness-acquired diarrhea is a variety of traveler's diarrhea in which backpackers and other outdoor enthusiasts are affected. Potential sources are contaminated food or water, or "hand-to-mouth", directly from another person who is infected. Cases generally resolve spontaneously, with or without treatment, and the cause is typically unknown. The National Outdoor Leadership School has recorded about one incident per 5,000 person-field days by following strict protocols on hygiene and water treatment. More limited, separate studies have presented highly varied estimated rates of affliction that range from 3 percent to 74 percent of wilderness visitors. One survey found that long-distance Appalachian Trail hikers reported diarrhea as their most common illness. Based on reviews of epidemiologic data and literature, some researchers believe that the risks have been over-stated and are poorly understood by the public.

== Symptoms and signs ==
The average incubation periods for giardiasis and cryptosporidiosis are each 7 days. Certain other bacterial and viral agents have shorter incubation periods, although hepatitis may take weeks to manifest itself. The onset usually occurs within the first week of return from the field, but may also occur at any time while hiking.

Most cases begin abruptly and usually result in increased frequency, volume, and weight of stool. Typically, a hiker experiences at least four to five loose or watery bowel movements each day. Other commonly associated symptoms are nausea, vomiting, abdominal cramping, bloating, low fever, urgency, and malaise, and usually the appetite is affected. The condition is much more serious if there is blood or mucus in stools, abdominal pain, or high fever. Dehydration is a possibility. Life-threatening illness resulting from WAD is extremely rare but can occur in people with weakened immune systems.

Some people may be carriers and not exhibit symptoms.

== Causes ==
Infectious diarrhea acquired in the wilderness is caused by various bacteria, viruses, and parasites (protozoa). The most commonly reported are the protozoa Giardia and Cryptosporidium. Other infectious agents may play a larger role than generally believed and include Campylobacter, hepatitis A virus, hepatitis E virus, enterotoxogenic E. coli, E. coli O157:H7, Shigella, and various other viruses. More rarely, Yersinia enterocolitica, Aeromonas hydrophila, and Cyanobacterium may also cause disease.

Giardia lamblia cysts usually do not tolerate freezing although some cysts can survive a single freeze–thaw cycle. Cysts can remain viable for nearly three months in river water when the temperature is 10 °C and about one month at 15–20 °C in lake water. Cryptosporidium may survive in cold waters (4 °C) for up to 18 months, and can even withstand freezing, although its viability is thereby greatly reduced. Many other varieties of diarrhea-causing organisms, including Shigella and Salmonella typhi, and hepatitis A virus, can survive freezing for weeks to months. Virologists believe all surface water in the United States and Canada has the potential to contain human viruses, which cause a wide range of illnesses including diarrhea, polio and meningitis. Modes of acquiring infection from these causes are limited to fecal-oral transmission, and contaminated water and food. The major factor governing pathogen content of surface water is human and animal activity in the watershed.

== Diagnosis ==
It may be difficult to associate a particular case of diarrhea with a recent wilderness trip of a few days because incubation of the disease may outlast the trip. Studies of trips that are much longer than the average incubation period, e.g. a week for Cryptosporidium and Giardia, are less susceptible to these errors since there is enough time for the diarrhea to occur during the trip. Other bacterial and viral agents have shorter incubation periods, although hepatitis may require weeks.

A suspected case of wilderness-acquired diarrhea may be assessed within the general context of intestinal complaints. During any given four-week period, as many as 7.2% of Americans may experience some form of infectious or non-infectious diarrhea. There are an estimated 99 million annual cases of intestinal infectious disease in the United States, most commonly from viruses, followed by bacteria and parasites, including Giardia and Cryptosporidium. There are an estimated 1.2 million U.S. cases of symptomatic giardiasis annually. However, only about 40% of cases are symptomatic.

== Prevention ==
Since wilderness acquired diarrhea can be caused by insufficient hygiene, contaminated water, and (possibly) increased susceptibility from vitamin deficiency, prevention methods should address these causes.

=== Hygiene ===
The risk of fecal-oral transmission of pathogens that cause diarrhea can be significantly reduced by good hygiene, including washing hands with soap and water after urination and defecation, and washing eating utensils with warm soapy water. Additionally a three-bowl system can be used for washing eating utensils.

=== Treating water ===
Water can be treated in the wilderness through filtering, chemical disinfectants, a portable ultraviolet light device, pasteurizing or boiling. Factors in choice may include the number of people involved, space and weight considerations, the quality of available water, personal taste and preferences, and fuel availability.

In a study of long-distance backpacking, it was found that water filters were used more consistently than chemical disinfectants. Inconsistent use of iodine or chlorine may be due to disagreeable taste, extended treatment time or treatment complexity due to water temperature and turbidity.

Because methods based on halogens, such as iodine and chlorine, do not kill Cryptosporidium, and because filtration misses some viruses, the best protection may require a two-step process of either filtration or coagulation-flocculation, followed by halogenation. Boiling is effective in all situations.

Iodine resins, if combined with microfiltration to remove resistant cysts, are also a viable single-step process, but may not be effective under all conditions. New one-step techniques using chlorine dioxide, ozone, and UV radiation may prove effective, but still require validation.

Ultraviolet (UV) light for water disinfection is well established and widely used for large applications, like municipal water systems. Some hikers use small portable UV devices which meet the U.S. EPA Guide Standard and Protocol for Testing Microbiological Water Purifiers, for example, the SteriPEN. Another approach to portable UV water purification is solar disinfection (also called sodis). Clear water is sterilized by putting it in a clear polyethylene (PET) bottle and leaving it in direct sunlight for 6 hours.

=== Water risk avoidance ===
Different types of water sources may have different levels of contamination:

- More contamination may be in water that
1. likely could have passed through an area subject to heavy human or animal use
2. is cloudy, has surface foam, or has some other suspicious appearance.
- Less contamination may be in water from
1. springs (provided the true source is not surface water a short distance above)
2. large streams (those entering from the side may have less contamination than those paralleling the trail)
3. fast-flowing streams
4. higher elevations
5. lakes with undisturbed sediments (10 days undisturbed water storage can result in 75–99% removal of coliform bacteria by settling to the bottom)
6. freshly melted snow
7. deep wells (provided they aren't subject to contamination from surface runoff)
8. regions where there was a heavy snow year when streams run full and long compared to dry years.

Rain storms can either improve or worsen water quality. They can wash contaminants into water and stir up contaminated sediments with increasing flow, but can also dilute contaminants by adding large amounts of water.

Unfortunately, there have not been any epidemiological studies to validate the above, except possibly for the case of spring water.

=== Vitamins ===
One study suggests that on very long trips in the wilderness, taking multivitamins may reduce the incidence of diarrhea.

== Treatment ==
WAD is typically self-limited, generally resolving without specific treatment. Oral rehydration therapy with rehydration salts is often beneficial to replace lost fluids and electrolytes. Clear, disinfected water or other liquids are routinely recommended.

Hikers who develop three or more loose stools in a 24-hour period – especially if associated with nausea, vomiting, abdominal cramps, fever, or blood in stools – should be treated by a doctor and may benefit from antibiotics, usually given for 3–5 days. Alternatively, a single dose azithromycin or levofloxacin may be prescribed. If diarrhea persists despite therapy, travelers should be evaluated and treated for possible parasitic infection.

Cryptosporidium can be quite dangerous to patients with compromised immune systems. Alinia (nitazoxanide) is approved by the FDA for treatment of Cryptosporidium.

== Epidemiology ==
The risk of acquiring infectious diarrhea in the wilderness arises from inadvertent ingestion of pathogens. Various studies have sought to estimate diarrhea attack rates among wilderness travelers, and results have ranged widely. The variation of diarrhea rate between studies may depend on the time of year, the location of the study, the length of time the hikers were in the wilderness, the prevention methods used, and the study methodology.

The National Outdoor Leadership School (NOLS), which emphasizes strict hand-washing techniques, water disinfection and washing of common cooking utensils in their programs, reports that gastrointestinal illnesses occurred at a rate of only 0.26 per 1000 program days. In contrast, a survey of long-distance Appalachian Trail hikers found more than half the respondents reported at least one episode of diarrhea that lasted an average of two days. (Infectious diarrhea may last longer than an average of two days; certain forms of non-infectious diarrhea, caused by diet change etc., can be of very brief duration). Analysis of this survey found occurrence of diarrhea was positively associated with the duration of exposure in the wilderness. During any given four-week period, as many as 7.2% of Americans may experience some form of infectious or non-infectious diarrhea. A number of behaviors each individually reduced the incidence of diarrhea: treating water; routinely washing hands with soap and water after defecation and urination; cleaning cooking utensils with soap and warm water; and taking multi-vitamins.

A variety of pathogens can cause infectious diarrhea, and most cases among backpackers appear to be caused by bacteria from feces. A study at Grand Teton National Park found 69% of diarrhea affected visitors had no identifiable cause, that 23% had diarrhea due to Campylobacter and 8% of patients with diarrhea had giardiasis. Campylobacter enteritis occurred most frequently in young adults who had hiked in wilderness areas and drunk untreated surface water in the week prior. Another study tested 35 individuals before and after a trip to the Desolation Wilderness of California. Giardia cysts were found in fecal samples from two people after the trip, but they were asymptomatic. A third person was empirically treated for symptoms of giardiasis.

Fecal-oral transmission may be the most common vector for wilderness acquired diarrhea. There are differing opinions regarding the importance of routine disinfection of water during relatively brief backcountry visits.

=== Backcountry water quality surveys ===
Infection by fecal coliform bacteria, which indicate fecal pollution, are more common than giardiasis. Risks are highest in surface water near trails used by pack animals and cattle pastures.

Most samples of backcountry water in the Desolation Wilderness in California have found very low or no Giardia cysts. The infectious dose of giardia, however, is very low, with about 2% chance of infection from a single cyst. Also, very few studies have addressed the issue of transient contamination. According to one researcher, the likely model for the risk of Giardia from wilderness water is pulse contamination, that is, a brief period of high cyst concentration from fecal contamination.

== Terminology ==
Diarrhea acquired in the wilderness or other remote areas is typically a form of infectious diarrhea, itself classified as a type of secretory diarrhea. These are all considered forms of gastroenteritis. The term may be applied in various remote areas of non-tropical developed countries (U.S., Canada, western Europe, etc.), but is less applicable in developing countries, and in the tropics, because of the different pathogens that are most likely to cause infection.

== See also ==
- Wilderness medicine
- Traveler's diarrhea
