= Amycolatopsis rifamycinica =

Scientific classification
- Domain: Bacteria
- Kingdom: Bacillati
- Phylum: Actinomycetota
- Class: Actinomycetia
- Order: Pseudonocardiales
- Family: Pseudonocardiaceae
- Genus: Amycolatopsis
- Species: A. rifamycinica

Binomial name
- Amycolatopsis rifamycinica Bala et al. 2004

Type strain
- ATCC 27643; DSM 46095; JCM 12674; NT 19

Species of bacterium

Amycolatopsis rifamycinica is a species of Gram-positive bacteria in the genus Amycolatopsis. It produces the rifamycin antibiotics (e.g., rifamycin SV), which are used to treat mycobacterial diseases such as tuberculosis and leprosy. The type strain of Amycolatopsis rifamycinica (DSM 46095) has been reclassified several times. When it was first isolated from a French soil sample in 1957, it was identified as Streptomyces mediterranei. In 1969, the species was renamed Nocardia mediterranei because its cell wall was thought to resemble that of Nocardia species. The species was renamed Amycolatopsis mediterranei in 1986 after finding that it is not susceptible to Nocardia phage and has a cell wall that lacks mycolic acid. Finally, in 2004, it was determined that strain DSM 46095 represented a new species, independent of Amycolatopsis mediterranei, based on 16S ribosomal RNA sequencing. The new species was named Amycolatopsis rifamycinica.
