= Ansamycin =

Group of chemical compounds

Structure of geldanamycin, one of the benzoquinone ansamycins.

Ansamycins is a family of bacterial secondary metabolites that show antimicrobial activity against many Gram-positive and some Gram-negative bacteria, and includes various compounds, including streptovaricins and rifamycins. In addition, these compounds demonstrate antiviral activity towards bacteriophages and poxviruses.

They are somewhat similar in structure to macrolide antibiotics, but because they have a lactam instead of a lactone, they do not belong in the class of macrolides.

== Structure ==
They are named ansamycins (from the Latin ansa, handle) because of their unique structure, which consists of an aromatic moiety bridged by an aliphatic chain. The main difference between various derivatives of ansamycins is the aromatic moiety, which can be a naphthalene ring or a naphthoquinone ring as in rifamycin and the naphthomycins. Another variation consists of benzene or a benzoquinone ring system as in geldanamycin or ansamitocin. Ansamycins were first discovered in 1959 by Sensi et al. from Amycolatopsis mediterranei, an actinomycete bacterium.

== Examples ==
Rifamycins are a subclass of ansamycins with high potency against mycobacteria. This resulted in their widespread use in the treatment of tuberculosis, leprosy, and AIDS-related mycobacterial infections. Since then various analogues have been isolated from other prokaryotes.
