= List of antiviral drugs =

Antiviral drugs are different from antibiotics. Flu antiviral drugs are different from antiviral drugs used to treat other infectious diseases such as COVID-19. Antiviral drugs prescribed to treat COVID-19 are not approved or authorized to treat flu or bts

List of Antiviral Drugs
Antiviral	Use	Manufacturer	Component	Type	Year approved
Abacavir	HIV	ViiV Healthcare		Nucleoside analogue reverse transcriptase inhibitor (NRTI)	1998
Acyclovir (Aciclovir)	Herpes simplex, chickenpox, varicella zoster virus	GSK		guanosine analogue RTI	1981
Adefovir	Hepatitis B	Gilead Sciences		RTI	2002 (FDA), 2003 (EU)
Amantadine	Influenza			Influenza A virus M2 proton channel antagonist	1966
Ampligen	Avian Influenza			Immunomodulatory double-stranded RNA	2016 (Argentina)
Amprenavir (Agenerase)	HIV			Protease inhibitor (PI)	1999 (FDA)
Atazanavir	HIV			PI	2015 (FDA)
Atripla (Efavirenz/emtricitabine/tenofovir)	HIV			Efavirenz: Non-nucleoside RTI (NNRTI); Emtricitabine: NRTI; Tenofovir disoproxil: NRTI	1998
Baloxavir marboxil (Xofluza)	Influenza A/B			Cap snatching endonuclease inhibitor	2018
Biktarvy (Bictegravir/emtricitabine/tenofovir alafenamide)	HIV	Gilead Sciences		Bictegravir: INSTI; Emtricitabine: NRTI; Tenofovir alafenamide: NRTI	2018
Boceprevir	Hepatitis C genotype 1	Schering-Plough, then Merck Group		Protease inhibitor	FDA approved 2011; Withdrawn 2015
Bulevirtide	Hepatitis D/B			Sodium/bile acid cotransporter inactivator	2020 (EU)
Cidofovir	AIDS			Viral DNA Polymerase inhibitor	1996 (FDA)
Cobicistat (Tybost)	HIV			human CYP3A protein inhibitor	
Combivir (Lamivudine/Zidovudine)	HIV			Lamivudine: cytidine analogue RTI; Zidovudine: thymidine analogue RTI	1997 (FDA)
Daclatasvir (Daklinza)	Hepatitis C			NS5A inhibitor	
Darunavir	HIV		antiretroviral	HIV PI	
Delavirdine	HIV		antiretroviral	NNRTI	
Descovy (Emtricitabine/tenofovir alafenamide)	Hepatitis B			Emtricitabine: NRTI; Tenofovir alafenamide: NRTI	
Didanosine	HIV			Adenosine analogue RTI	1991 (FDA)
Docosanol	Herpes Simplex			Entry inhibitor	2000 (FDA)
Dolutegravir	HIV			Integrase inhibitor	
Doravirine (Pifeltro)	HIV	Merck & Co		NNRTI	2018 (FDA)
Edoxudine	Herpes Simplex			Thymidine analogue inhibitor	
Efavirenz	HIV	Mylan		NNRTI	1998
Elvitegravir	HIV	Gilead Sciences		Integrase inhibitor	2012 (Fixed-dose combo Stribild); 2014 (single pill); 2015 (Genvoya)
Emtricitabine	HIV	Gilead Sciences		NRTI	2003
Enfuvirtide	HIV			Entry inhibitor	2003
Ensitrelvir	COVID-19	Shionogi		3C-like protease inhibitor	
Entecavir	HIV			NRTI	2005
Etravirine (Intelence)	HIV			NNRTI	2008
Famciclovir	Herpes Zoster			Guanosine analogue	1994
Fomivirsen	AIDS		Anti-sense oligonucleotide	Anti-sense	FDA-licensed in 1998; Withdrawn in EU (2002), US (2006)
Fosamprenavir	HIV	ViiV Healthcare		Amprenavir pro-drug	2003 (FDA), 2004 (EMA)
Foscarnet	Herpes			Pyrophosphate analogue DNA polymerase inhibitor	1991
Ganciclovir (Cytovene)	Cytomegalovirus (CMV)			Competitive nucleoside analogue dGTP inhibitor	1988
Ibacitabine	Herpes labialis				
Ibalizumab (Trogarzo)	HIV			Entry inhibitor	2018
Idoxuridine	Herpes			dU analogue inhibitor	1962
Imiquimod	Genital wart, Basal cell carcinoma, Actinic keratosis			Opioid growth factor receptor (OGFr) agonist	1997
Inosine pranobex	Herpes Simplex			Thymus hormone immunostimulant	
Indinavir	HIV			PI	1996
Lamivudine	HIV			cytidine analogue RTI	
Letermovir (Prevymis)	Cytomegalovirus (CMV)				
Lopinavir	HIV				
Loviride	HIV				
Maraviroc	HIV			entry inhibitor	
Methisazone	Smallpox				
Molnupiravir	COVID-19	Merck & Co.		viral RNA polymerase inhibitor	
Moroxydine	Influenza				
Nelfinavir	HIV				
Nirmatrelvir/ritonavir (Paxlovid)	COVID-19	Pfizer		3C-like protease inhibitor (Nirmatrelvir) / inhibition of metabolism of nirmatrelvir (ritonavir)	
Nevirapine	HIV			non-nucleoside reverse transcriptase inhibitor	
Nitazoxanide	Broad-spectrum antiviral		thiazolide		
Norvir	HIV				
Oseltamivir (Tamiflu)	Influenza			neuraminidase inhibitor	
Peramivir (Rapivab)	Influenza				
Penciclovir	Herpes				
Pleconaril	Picornavirus	Schering-Plough			
Podophyllotoxin	Genital wart				
Raltegravir	HIV			Integrase inhibitor	
Raphamin					
Remdesivir	COVID-19			viral RNA polymerase inhibitor	
Ribavirin	Hepatitis C			nucleoside analogue reverse transcriptase inhibitor	
Rilpivirine (Edurant)	HIV				
Rimantadine	Influenza A			M2 proton channel antagonist	
Ritonavir	HIV			HIV-1 protease inhibitor	
Saquinavir	HIV				
Simeprevir (Olysio)	Hepatitis C				
Sofosbuvir	Hepatitis C			nucleoside analogue reverse transcriptase inhibitor	
Stavudine	HIV				
Taribavirin (Viramidine)	Hepatitis Syndromes in which Ribavirin is active				
Telaprevir	Hepatitis C				
Telbivudine (Tyzeka)	Hepatitis B				
Tenofovir alafenamide	Hepatitis B				
Tenofovir disoproxil	Hepatitis B, HIV				
Tipranavir	HIV				
Trifluridine	Eyes related Herpes				
Trizivir	HIV				
Tromantadine	Herpes Simplex				
Truvada	HIV				
Umifenovir (Arbidol)	Influenza			Hemagglutinin inhibitor	
Valaciclovir (Valtrex)	Herpes Simplex/Zoster				
Valganciclovir (Valcyte)	Cytomegalovirus (CMV)				
Vicriviroc	HIV-1	Schering-Plough		pyrimidine CCR5 entry inhibitor	
Vidarabine	Herpes Simplex, Varicella Zoster				
Zalcitabine	HIV				
Zanamivir (Relenza)	Influenza A, Influenza B				
Zidovudine	HIV		Antiretroviral		
