= List of antiretroviral fixed-dose combinations =

Antiretroviral drugs are used to manage HIV/AIDS. Multiple antiretroviral drugs are often combined into a single pill in order to reduce pill burden.

Some of these combinations are complete single-tablet regimens; the others must be combined with additional pills to make a treatment regimen.

Brand name(s)	Ingredients (INN)					Food and Drug Administration (FDA) approval date	European Medicines Agency (EMA) approval date	Health Canada approval date	Company	Single-tablet regimen?
Brand name(s)	NRTIs / NtRTIs	NNRTI	INSTI	PI	PK enhancer	Food and Drug Administration (FDA) approval date	European Medicines Agency (EMA) approval date	Health Canada approval date	Company	Single-tablet regimen?
Combivir	lamivudine zidovudine					September 26, 1997			ViiV Healthcare	No
Kaletra (developed countries); Aluvia (developing countries)				lopinavir	ritonavir	September 15, 2000			Abbott Laboratories	No
Trizivir	abacavir lamivudine zidovudine					November 15, 2000			ViiV Healthcare	Yes
Epzicom (US); Kivexa (EU, RU)	abacavir lamivudine					August 2, 2004			ViiV Healthcare	No
Generics, e.g., Triomune	lamivudine stavudine	nevirapine				(not approved)			(many companies)	Yes
Generics, e.g., Duovir-N	lamivudine zidovudine	nevirapine				(not approved)			(many companies)	Yes
Truvada	emtricitabine tenofovir disoproxil					August 2, 2004			Gilead Sciences	No
Atripla	emtricitabine tenofovir disoproxil	efavirenz				July 12, 2006			Gilead Sciences; Bristol-Myers Squibb	Yes
Complera (US); Eviplera (EU, RU)	emtricitabine tenofovir disoproxil	rilpivirine				August 10, 2011			Gilead Sciences; Janssen Pharmaceutica	Yes
Stribild	emtricitabine tenofovir disoproxil		elvitegravir		cobicistat	August 27, 2012			Gilead Sciences	Yes
Triumeq	abacavir lamivudine		dolutegravir			August 22, 2014			ViiV Healthcare	Yes
Evotaz				atazanavir	cobicistat	January 29, 2015			Bristol-Myers Squibb	No
Prezcobix (US); Rezolsta (EU)				darunavir	cobicistat	January 29, 2015			Janssen Pharmaceutica	No
Dutrebis	lamivudine		raltegravir			February 6, 2015			Merck & Co.	No
Genvoya	emtricitabine tenofovir alafenamide		elvitegravir		cobicistat	November 5, 2015			Gilead Sciences	Yes
Odefsey	emtricitabine tenofovir alafenamide	rilpivirine				March 1, 2016			Gilead Sciences	Yes
Descovy	emtricitabine tenofovir alafenamide					April 4, 2016			Gilead Sciences	No
Juluca		rilpivirine	dolutegravir			November 21, 2017			ViiV Healthcare	Yes
Symfi, Symfi Lo	lamivudine tenofovir disoproxil	efavirenz				February 5, 2018 (Symfi Lo); March 22, 2018 (Symfi)			Mylan	Yes
Biktarvy	emtricitabine tenofovir alafenamide		bictegravir			February 7, 2018			Gilead Sciences	Yes
Cimduo, Temixys	lamivudine tenofovir disoproxil					February 28, 2018			Mylan	No
Symtuza	emtricitabine tenofovir alafenamide			darunavir	cobicistat	July 17, 2018			Janssen Pharmaceutica	Yes
Delstrigo	lamivudine tenofovir disoproxil	doravirine				August 30, 2018			Merck & Co.	Yes
Dovato	lamivudine		dolutegravir			April 8, 2019			ViiV Healthcare	Yes
Cabenuva		rilpivirine	cabotegravir			January 21, 2021		March 18, 2020	ViiV Healthcare	No
Idvynso	islatravir	doravirine				April 20, 2026			Merck & Co.	Yes
