= Lamivudine/nevirapine/zidovudine =

Anti-HIV combination medication

Combination of
- Lamivudine: nucleoside reverse transcriptase inhibitor
- Nevirapine: non-nucleoside reverse transcriptase inhibitor
- Zidovudine: nucleoside reverse transcriptase inhibitor

Clinical data
- Trade names: Duovir-N, Zidovex-LN, others
- ATC code: J05AR05 (WHO)

Identifiers
- CAS Number: 1256374-17-0
- ChemSpider: none

Lamivudine/nevirapine/zidovudine (3TC/NVP/AZT) is a fixed-dose combination antiretroviral medication used to treat HIV/AIDS. It contains lamivudine, nevirapine, and zidovudine. It is either used by itself or along with other antiretrovirals. It is a recommended treatment in those who are pregnant. It is taken by mouth twice a day.

The medication is generally well tolerated. Side effects are those of the underlying medications. This includes rash, pancreatitis, low white blood cell levels, and muscle pain. Use is not recommended in those with significant liver problems. Use in pregnancy and breastfeeding appear to be safe. The combination tablet is typically not appropriate for children.

It is on the World Health Organization's List of Essential Medicines. The combination is not commercially available in the United States as of 2018.

== See also ==
- Lamivudine/zidovudine
- Abacavir/lamivudine/zidovudine
