= Lamivudine/nevirapine/stavudine =

Combination drug for HIV

Combination of
- Lamivudine: nucleoside reverse transcriptase inhibitor
- Nevirapine: non-nucleoside reverse transcriptase inhibitor
- Stavudine: nucleoside reverse transcriptase inhibitor

Clinical data
- Trade names: Triomune, others
- ATC code: J05AR07 (WHO)

Identifiers
- CAS Number: 811471-91-7
- ChemSpider: none

Lamivudine/nevirapine/stavudine (3TC/NVP/d4T) is a fixed-dose combination antiretroviral medication used to treat HIV/AIDS. It contains lamivudine, nevirapine, and stavudine. It is either used by itself or along with other antiretrovirals. It is taken by mouth twice a day.

It is on the World Health Organization's List of Essential Medicines. As of 2015, it is not commercially available in the United States.

== Medical uses ==
It is a common first line treatment in the developing world.

== Adverse effects and safety ==
The medication is generally well tolerated. Side effects are those of the underlying medications. This may include rash, numbness, pancreatitis, and high blood lactate levels. Use is not recommended in those with significant liver problems. It is unclear if use in pregnancy is safe for the baby and recommendations include starting in the second trimester if possible.
