= AMA Medical Manufacturing Limited =

Nigerian pharmaceutical manufacturer

- Trade name: AMA-MED
- Type: Private
- Industry: Pharmaceutical manufacturing
- Founded: 2019; 7 years ago
- Headquarters: Kudenda Industrial Layout, Kaduna, Kaduna State, Nigeria
- Key people: Abdulsalami Nasidi (Chairman); Abdullahi Musa Bello (Founder)
- Products: Intravenous fluids
- Parent: AMA Investment & Infrastructure Holdings
- Website: www.ama-medng.com

AMA Medical Manufacturing Limited (trading as AMA-MED) is a Nigerian pharmaceutical company that produces intravenous (IV) fluid solutions at a facility in the Kudenda Industrial Layout in Kaduna, Kaduna State. Founded in 2019, the company is listed by the National Agency for Food and Drug Administration and Control (NAFDAC) among registered pharmaceutical manufacturers in Nigeria's North West Zone. It is a subsidiary of AMA Investment & Infrastructure Holdings.

== History ==
AMA Medical Manufacturing was incorporated in 2019 under Systems Trade & Services Nigeria Limited. Construction of its first manufacturing facility in Kaduna began shortly afterwards.

On 14 March 2024, World Trade Organization Director-General Ngozi Okonjo-Iweala performed the groundbreaking ceremony for the second phase of the company's plant. The event was attended by Ali Muhammad Pate, Nigeria's Coordinating Minister of Health and Social Welfare, and a representative of Vice President Kashim Shettima. Okonjo-Iweala described the project as relevant to regional trade and pharmaceutical supply across Africa.

In August 2024, AMA Medical signed a memorandum of understanding with Echitab Study Group Nigeria and the United Kingdom-based firm Micropharm Ltd for the local production of anti-snake venom drugs in Nigeria. The agreement was signed at the company's Kudenda facility and was described by reporting outlets as a step toward domestic production of anti-snake venom, which had historically been manufactured in the United Kingdom and Costa Rica. At the signing, Chairman Abdulsalami Nasidi represented AMA Medical, Lan Cameroon signed for Micropharm, and Marc Nassar signed for Echitab Study Group Nigeria.

In September 2025, AMA Foundation chairman Abdullahi Musa Bello presented the company at a stakeholder meeting at World Health Organization headquarters in Geneva, where AMA Medical was discussed in the context of local pharmaceutical manufacturing capacity in Africa.

In November 2025, AMA Medical was named in a Memorandum of Understanding signed in Abuja between Barbados Pharmaceuticals Inc. (BPI) and Nigeria's Presidential Initiative for Unlocking the Healthcare Value Chain (PVAC). The agreement covers pharmaceutical production, regulatory cooperation and market access across CARICOM, ECOWAS and the African Continental Free Trade Area. Reports described AMA Medical as evaluating a possible manufacturing facility in Barbados.

In December 2025, Ahmadu Bello University and AMA Medical announced an intended partnership for drug development and commercialisation of research outputs, following a visit by the university's vice-chancellor to the Kaduna facility.

== Operations ==
The company operates a pharmaceutical manufacturing facility in the Kudenda Industrial Layout, Kaduna. The plant uses Automatic Form-Fill-Seal (AFFS) aseptic technology, in which pouches are formed, filled and sealed within a single sterile process. According to reporting by the News Agency of Nigeria, the facility had an annual capacity of approximately 10 million pouches at the time of its phase two groundbreaking in March 2024.

AMA Medical packages its IV fluid products in polypropylene pouches and produces a 250 ml pack size alongside other formats. In a September 2025 presentation at the WHO, the company stated that it had scaled capacity to 36 million units per year across 13 formulations.

== Products ==
AMA Medical's product line consists of large volume parenteral IV fluids, including Normal Saline, Dextrose Saline and Dextrose solutions. Additional formulations reported by the company include Ringer's Lactate, Mannitol, Ciprofloxacin infusion, Metronidazole infusion, Darrow's Solution and Water for Injection. The company is registered with NAFDAC as a domestic manufacturer.

== Partnerships ==
In August 2024, AMA Medical signed a memorandum of understanding with Echitab Study Group Nigeria and Micropharm Ltd of the United Kingdom for the local production of anti-snake venom drugs in Nigeria, with the agreement signed at the company's Kudenda facility.

The company has also been reported to be working with San Diego-based Viriom Inc. in connection with a Phase III clinical trial of elsulfavirine (marketed as Elpida), a non-nucleoside reverse transcriptase inhibitor for HIV treatment, at the University of Maiduguri Teaching Hospital.

In December 2025, Ahmadu Bello University and AMA Medical announced plans to collaborate on drug development and the commercialisation of university research, following a visit by the university's vice-chancellor to the Kaduna facility. A foundation stone-laying ceremony for the partnership was subsequently reported in early 2026.

== Parent company ==
AMA Medical Manufacturing is a subsidiary of AMA Investment & Infrastructure Holdings, whose principal operating entity is Systems Trade & Services Nigeria Limited, incorporated in 1994.

== See also ==
- Pharmaceutical industry in Nigeria
- National Agency for Food and Drug Administration and Control
- Intravenous therapy
