= Narlaprevir =

Chemical compound

Clinical data
- Trade names: Arlansa
- Other names: SCH 900518
- Routes of administration: By mouth
- ATC code: J05AP14 (WHO)

Legal status
- Legal status: RU: Rx-only

Pharmacokinetic data
- Protein binding: 86.5–91.4%
- Metabolism: Extensive hepatic through oxidation, reduction and N-dealkylation (CYP3A4)
- Excretion: Feces (81.1%), urine (3.14%)

Identifiers
- IUPAC name: (1R,2S,5S)-3-[(2S)-2-[ [1-(tert-Butylsulfonylmethyl)cyclohexyl]carbamoylamino]-3,3-dimethylbutanoyl]-N-[(3S)-1-(cyclopropylamino)-1,2-dioxoheptan-3-yl]-6,6-dimethyl-3-azabicyclo[3.1.0]hexane-2-carboxamide
- CAS Number: 865466-24-6
- PubChem CID: 11857239
- DrugBank: DB14760
- ChemSpider: ID10031710
- UNII: 2857LA2O07
- KEGG: D09644
- ChEBI: CHEBI:173104
- ChEMBL: ChEMBL1255891
- CompTox Dashboard (EPA): DTXSID801025746

Chemical and physical data
- Formula: C_{36}H_{61}N_{5}O_{7}S
- Molar mass: 707.97 g·mol^{−1}
- 3D model (JSmol)
- SMILES: CCCC[C@H](NC(=O)[C@@H]1[C@@H]2[C@H](CN1C(=O)[C@@H](NC(=O)NC3(CS(=O)(=O)C(C)(C)C)CCCCC3)C(C)(C)C)C2(C)C)C(=O)C(=O)NC4CC4
- InChI: InChI=1S/C36H61N5O7S/c1-10-11-15-24(27(42)30(44)37-22-16-17-22)38-29(43)26-25-23(35(25,8)9)20-41(26)31(45)28(33(2,3)4)39-32(46)40-36(18-13-12-14-19-36)21-49(47,48)34(5,6)7/h22-26,28H,10-21H2,1-9H3,(H,37,44)(H,38,43)(H2,39,40,46)/t23-,24-,25-,26-,28+/m0/s1; Key:RICZEKWVNZFTNZ-LFGITCQGSA-N

Narlaprevir (trade name Arlansa, codenamed SCH 900518), is an inhibitor of NS3/4A serine protease, intended for the treatment of chronic hepatitis C caused by genotype 1 virus in combination with other antiviral drugs.

Narlaprevir is the first Russian tableted medication for the treatment of chronic hepatitis C.

== Mechanism of action ==
Narlaprevir is an oral NS3 serine protease inhibitor of hepatitis C virus. It inhibits viral replication in infected host cells. The mechanism of inhibition involves reversible covalent binding of narlaprevir with NS3 protease active site via the ketoamide functional group.

Narlaprevir does not bind to human proteases, with the exception of cathepsin B (69% inhibition). Overexpression of cathepsin B is associated with the development of malignancies.

== Usage ==
Indications

Treatment of chronic hepatitis C virus (HCV) infection genotype 1 in combination with ritonavir, pegylated interferon alfa and ribavirin, in patients older than 18 years with compensated liver disease who are treatment-naïve or have failed dual combination of pegylated interferon alfa and ribavirin. Narlaprevir cannot be used as a single agent.

Contraindications

Narlaprevir has some contraindications. In particular:

- pregnancy or lactation
- children up to 18 years of age
- severe neutropenia
- liver failure
- prior treatment with HCV protease inhibitors
- lactase deficiency, lactose intolerance, glucose-galactose malabsorption.

== Efficacy studies ==
H. Reesink et al. (2009) demonstrated narlaprevir safety and antiviral activity both as a single agent and in dual combination with pegylated interferon alfa-2b.

X. Tong et al. (2010) demonstrated narlaprevir activity against HCV mutations causing resistance to boceprevir and telaprevir.

In the year 2016 a large-scale phase III multicenter PIONEER study was completed. Sustained virologic response (SVR) was 89% in treatment-naïve and 70% in treatment-experienced patients 24 weeks after the end of treatment in the narlaprevir group, whereas in the control group SVR was only 59.6% in treatment-naïve and 24.5% in treatment-experienced patients on dual therapy with pegylated interferon alfa and ribavirin. Adding narlaprevir to dual therapy with pegylated interferon alfa and ribavirin did not affect narlaprevir safety profile. A phase I study of narlaprevir pharmacokinetics in combination with ritonavir in patients with compensated cirrhosis was also completed (Liver Meeting AASLD, 13–17 February 2015, San Francisco, California, USA).

According to professor I.G. Bakulin, the head of the Department of Hepatology of the Moscow clinical research center and chief gastroenterologist of Moscow government healthcare department, the regulatory approval of narlaprevir has become a major milestone accomplished in the fight against hepatitis C in Russia.

== History ==
In 2012, the pharmaceutical group R-Pharm acquired a license to manufacture narlaprevir from the Merck & Co. (MSD). Further development of the drug was conducted by R-Pharm in cooperation with Texas Liver Institute (USA), with the support of the Federal Target Program "Development of the Pharmaceutical and Medical Industry of the Russian Federation for the period up to 2020 and beyond". About 700 million rubles were invested in clinical trials and the development of the drug, of which 120 million rubles came from the Russian Government.

Preclinical and clinical studies of the drug were conducted in Schering-Plough Research Institute (USA), as well as in a number of clinical centers in Europe, USA and Russia.The drug is manufactured at a pharmaceutical factory in the Russian city of Yaroslavl.
