= Loviride =

Chemical compound

Clinical data
- Other names: R089439; loveride
- ATC code: None

Identifiers
- IUPAC name: 2-[(2-Acetyl-5-methylphenyl)amino]-2-(2,6-dichlorophenyl)acetamide
- CAS Number: 147362-57-0
- PubChem CID: 3963
- ChemSpider: 3826
- UNII: 3S1R1LZ09H
- KEGG: D04786
- ChEMBL: ChEMBL37624
- CompTox Dashboard (EPA): DTXSID60869958

Chemical and physical data
- Formula: C_{17}H_{16}Cl_{2}N_{2}O_{2}
- Molar mass: 351.23 g·mol^{−1}
- 3D model (JSmol): Interactive image
- SMILES: Clc1cccc(Cl)c1C(Nc2cc(ccc2C(=O)C)C)C(=O)N
- InChI: InChI=1S/C17H16Cl2N2O2/c1-9-6-7-11(10(2)22)14(8-9)21-16(17(20)23)15-12(18)4-3-5-13(15)19/h3-8,16,21H,1-2H3,(H2,20,23); Key:CJPLEFFCVDQQFZ-UHFFFAOYSA-N

Loviride is an experimental antiviral drug manufactured by Janssen (now part of Janssen-Cilag) that is active against HIV. Loviride is a non-nucleoside reverse transcriptase inhibitor (NNRTI) that entered phase III clinical trials in the late 1990s, but failed to gain marketing approval because of poor potency. It is of clinical significance only in those patients who were enrolled in clinical trials to evaluate loviride (e.g., CAESAR and AVANTI), because in those trials loviride was often given alone and with no companion drug, leading to a high probability of developing reverse transcriptase mutations such as K103N which result in cross-class resistance to the NNRTIs efavirenz and nevirapine.
