= Lamivudine/raltegravir =

Combination drug for HIV

Combination of
- Lamivudine: Reverse-transcriptase inhibitor
- Raltegravir: Integrase inhibitor

Clinical data
- Trade names: Dutrebis
- Routes of administration: Oral
- ATC code: J05AR16 (WHO)

Legal status
- Legal status: US: ℞-only

Identifiers
- CAS Number: 2446160-46-7
- KEGG: D10754

Lamivudine/raltegravir (3TC/RAL), sold under the brand name Dutrebis, is a fixed-dose combination antiretroviral medication used in the treatment of HIV/AIDS. It contains lamivudine and raltegravir. It is taken by mouth. Side effects may include lactic acidosis, pancreatitis, liver failure, and severe skin rashes. It was approved for medical use in the United States in 2015.

Lamivudine/raltegravir is not available in the United States.
