= Lamivudine/tenofovir =

Combination antiretroviral medication for the treatment of HIV/AIDS

Combination of
- Lamivudine: Nucleoside reverse transcriptase inhibitor
- Tenofovir disoproxil: Nucleotide reverse transcriptase inhibitor

Clinical data
- Trade names: Cimduo, Temixys
- AHFS/Drugs.com: Monograph
- MedlinePlus: a618039
- License data: US DailyMed: Cimduo
- Routes of administration: By mouth
- ATC code: J05AR12 (WHO)

Legal status
- Legal status: US: ℞-only

Identifiers
- KEGG: D11395

Lamivudine/tenofovir disoproxil (3TC/TDF), sold under the brand name Cimduo among others, is a fixed-dose combination antiretroviral medication for the treatment of HIV/AIDS in adults and children weighing more than 35 kilograms (77 lb). It contains lamivudine and tenofovir disoproxil. It is taken by mouth.

Lamivudine/tenofovir was approved for medical use in the United States in February 2018.
