= Rovafovir etalafenamide =

Chemical compound

Legal status
- Legal status: Investigational

Identifiers
- IUPAC name: Ethyl (2S)-2-[[[(2R,5R)-5-(6-aminopurin-9-yl)-4-fluoro-2,5-dihydrofuran-2-yl]oxymethyl-phenoxyphosphoryl]amino]propanoate
- CAS Number: 912809-27-9
- PubChem CID: 15958717
- ChemSpider: 34553889
- UNII: U8S0IC8DY7
- KEGG: D11721
- ChEMBL: ChEMBL4594257

Chemical and physical data
- Formula: C_{21}H_{24}FN_{6}O_{6}P
- Molar mass: 506.431 g·mol^{−1}
- 3D model (JSmol): Interactive image
- SMILES: CCOC(=O)[C@H](C)N[P@@](=O)(CO[C@H]1O[C@@H](N2C=NC3=C2N=CN=C3N)C(F)=C1)OC4=CC=CC=C4
- InChI: InChI=1S/C21H24FN6O6P/c1-3-31-21(29)13(2)27-35(30,34-14-7-5-4-6-8-14)12-32-16-9-15(22)20(33-16)28-11-26-17-18(23)24-10-25-19(17)28/h4-11,13,16,20H,3,12H2,1-2H3,(H,27,30)(H2,23,24,25)/t13-,16-,20+,35+/m0/s1; Key:OCJRRXHWPBXZSU-BJBBEUPESA-N

Rovafovir etalafenamide (development code GS-9131) is an experimental drug for the treatment of HIV-1 infection. Rovafovir etalafenamide is a nucleotide reverse transcriptase inhibitor and prodrug of GS-9148. Rovafovir etalafenamide itself has no antiviral activity, but once consumed it is metabolized through the hydrolysis of the phosphonoamidate group to generate the antiviral compound GS-9148.

Chemical strucuture of GS-9148, the active antiviral agent

The drug is being developed by Gilead Sciences.

Rovafovir etalafenamide shows antiviral activity against viruses containing major mutations associated with resistance to the nucleoside analog reverse-transcriptase inhibitors which are commonly used to treat HIV/AIDS infection.

The methods by which the drug is synthesized has been published.
