= ATC code J05 =

ATC code J05 Antivirals for systemic use is a therapeutic subgroup of the Anatomical Therapeutic Chemical Classification System, a system of alphanumeric codes developed by the World Health Organization (WHO) for the classification of drugs and other medical products. Subgroup J05 is part of the anatomical group J Antiinfectives for systemic use.

Codes for veterinary use (ATCvet codes) can be created by placing the letter Q in front of the human ATC code: for example, QJ05.
National versions of the ATC classification may include additional codes not present in this list, which follows the WHO version.

== J05A Direct acting antiviral drugs ==
=== J05AA Thiosemicarbazones ===
J05AA01 Metisazone

=== J05AB Nucleosides and nucleotides excluding reverse transcriptase inhibitors ===
J05AB01 Aciclovir
J05AB02 Idoxuridine
J05AB03 Vidarabine
J05AB06 Ganciclovir
J05AB09 Famciclovir
J05AB11 Valaciclovir
J05AB12 Cidofovir
J05AB13 Penciclovir
J05AB14 Valganciclovir
J05AB15 Brivudine
J05AB16 Remdesivir
J05AB17 Brincidofovir
J05AB18 Molnupiravir

=== J05AC Cyclic amines ===
J05AC02 Rimantadine
J05AC03 Tromantadine

=== J05AD Phosphonic acid derivatives ===
J05AD01 Foscarnet
J05AD02 Fosfonet

=== J05AE Protease inhibitors ===
J05AE01 Saquinavir
J05AE02 Indinavir
J05AE03 Ritonavir
J05AE04 Nelfinavir
J05AE05 Amprenavir
J05AE07 Fosamprenavir
J05AE08 Atazanavir
J05AE09 Tipranavir
J05AE10 Darunavir
J05AE11 Ensitrelvir
J05AE30 Nirmatrelvir and ritonavir

=== J05AF Nucleoside and nucleotide reverse-transcriptase inhibitors ===
J05AF01 Zidovudine
J05AF02 Didanosine
J05AF03 Zalcitabine
J05AF04 Stavudine
J05AF05 Lamivudine
J05AF06 Abacavir
J05AF07 Tenofovir disoproxil
J05AF08 Adefovir dipivoxil
J05AF09 Emtricitabine
J05AF10 Entecavir
J05AF11 Telbivudine
J05AF12 Clevudine
J05AF13 Tenofovir alafenamide

=== J05AG Non-nucleoside reverse-transcriptase inhibitors ===
J05AG01 Nevirapine
J05AG02 Delavirdine
J05AG03 Efavirenz
J05AG04 Etravirine
J05AG05 Rilpivirine
J05AG06 Doravirine
J05AG07 Elsulfavirine

=== J05AH Neuraminidase inhibitors ===
J05AH01 Zanamivir
J05AH02 Oseltamivir
J05AH03 Peramivir
J05AH04 Laninamivir

=== J05AJ Integrase inhibitors ===
J05AJ01 Raltegravir
J05AJ02 Elvitegravir
J05AJ03 Dolutegravir
J05AJ04 Cabotegravir

=== J05AP Antivirals for treatment of HCV infections ===
J05AP01 Ribavirin
J05AP02 Telaprevir
J05AP03 Boceprevir
J05AP04 Faldaprevir
J05AP05 Simeprevir
J05AP06 Asunaprevir
J05AP07 Daclatasvir
J05AP08 Sofosbuvir
J05AP09 Dasabuvir
J05AP10 Elbasvir
J05AP11 Grazoprevir
J05AP12 Coblopasvir
J05AP13 Ravidasvir
J05AP14 Narlaprevir
J05AP51 Sofosbuvir and ledipasvir
J05AP52 Dasabuvir, ombitasvir, paritaprevir and ritonavir
J05AP53 Ombitasvir, paritaprevir and ritonavir
J05AP54 Elbasvir and grazoprevir
J05AP55 Sofosbuvir and velpatasvir
J05AP56 Sofosbuvir, velpatasvir and voxilaprevir
J05AP57 Glecaprevir and pibrentasvir
J05AP58 Daclatasvir, asunaprevir and beclabuvir

=== J05AR Antivirals for treatment of HIV infections, combinations ===
J05AR01 Zidovudine and lamivudine
J05AR02 Lamivudine and abacavir
J05AR03 Tenofovir disoproxil and emtricitabine
J05AR04 Zidovudine, lamivudine and abacavir
J05AR05 Zidovudine, lamivudine and nevirapine
J05AR06 Emtricitabine, tenofovir disoproxil and efavirenz
J05AR07 Stavudine, lamivudine and nevirapine
J05AR08 Emtricitabine, tenofovir disoproxil and rilpivirine
J05AR09 Emtricitabine, tenofovir disoproxil, elvitegravir and cobicistat
J05AR10 Lopinavir and ritonavir
J05AR11 Lamivudine, tenofovir disoproxil and efavirenz
J05AR12 Lamivudine and tenofovir disoproxil
J05AR13 Lamivudine, abacavir and dolutegravir
J05AR14 Darunavir and cobicistat
J05AR15 Atazanavir and cobicistat
J05AR16 Lamivudine and raltegravir
J05AR17 Emtricitabine and tenofovir alafenamide
J05AR18 Emtricitabine, tenofovir alafenamide, elvitegravir and cobicistat
J05AR19 Emtricitabine, tenofovir alafenamide and rilpivirine
J05AR20 Emtricitabine, tenofovir alafenamide and bictegravir
J05AR21 Dolutegravir and rilpivirine
J05AR22 Emtricitabine, tenofovir alafenamide, darunavir and cobicistat
J05AR23 Atazanavir and ritonavir
J05AR24 Lamivudine, tenofovir disoproxil and doravirine
J05AR25 Lamivudine and dolutegravir
J05AR26 Darunavir and ritonavir
J05AR27 Lamivudine, tenofovir disoproxil and dolutegravir
J05AR28 Stavudine and lamivudine
J05AR29 Emtricitabine, tenofovir alafenamide and dolutegravir

=== J05AX Other antivirals ===
J05AX01 Moroxydine
J05AX02 Lysozyme
J05AX05 Inosine pranobex
J05AX06 Pleconaril
J05AX07 Enfuvirtide
J05AX09 Maraviroc
J05AX10 Maribavir
J05AX12 Dolutegravir
J05AX13 Umifenovir
J05AX17 Enisamium iodide
J05AX18 Letermovir
J05AX19 Tilorone
J05AX21 Pentanedioic acid imidazolyl ethanamide
J05AX23 Ibalizumab
J05AX24 Tecovirimat
J05AX25 Baloxavir marboxil
J05AX26 Amenamevir
J05AX27 Favipiravir
J05AX28 Bulevirtide
J05AX29 Fostemsavir
J05AX31 Lenacapavir
J05AX32 Riamilovir
J05AX33 Labuvirtide
