= Elsulfavirine =

Chemical compound

Clinical data
- Trade names: Elpida
- Other names: VM 1500; elpivirine
- ATC code: J05AG07 (WHO)

Legal status
- Legal status: Rx-only in Russia

Identifiers
- IUPAC name: N-[4-[[2-[4-Bromo-3-(3-chloro-5-cyanophenoxy)-2-fluorophenyl]acetyl]amino]-3-chlorophenyl]sulfonylpropanamide
- CAS Number: 868046-19-9
- PubChem CID: 11527519
- DrugBank: 14929
- ChemSpider: 9702305
- UNII: ZC4CGO0RUG
- KEGG: D13018
- ChEMBL: ChEMBL4301163

Chemical and physical data
- Formula: C_{24}H_{17}BrCl_{2}FN_{3}O_{5}S
- Molar mass: 629.28 g·mol^{−1}
- 3D model (JSmol): Interactive image
- SMILES: CCC(=O)NS(=O)(=O)C1=CC(=C(C=C1)NC(=O)CC2=C(C(=C(C=C2)Br)OC3=CC(=CC(=C3)C#N)Cl)F)Cl
- InChI: InChI=1S/C24H17BrCl2FN3O5S/c1-2-21(32)31-37(34,35)17-4-6-20(19(27)11-17)30-22(33)9-14-3-5-18(25)24(23(14)28)36-16-8-13(12-29)7-15(26)10-16/h3-8,10-11H,2,9H2,1H3,(H,30,33)(H,31,32); Key:ULTDEARCBRNRGR-UHFFFAOYSA-N

Elsulfavirine (trade name Elpida; also known as VM 1500) is drug used to treat HIV infection. It is a non-nucleoside reverse transcriptase inhibitor (NNRTI). Elsulfavirine is a prodrug which is metabolized to the active antiviral agent deselsulfavirine (also known as VM 1500A). It was developed by the Russian company Viriom.

In June 2017, elsulfavirine was approved for use in Russia as an oral formulation for the treatment of HIV-1 infections in combination with other antiretroviral drugs. Currently, elsulfavirine is used in antiretroviral therapy regimens in the Russian Federation, which includes the combination elsulfavirine + lamivudine (or emtricitabine) + tenofovir.

Long-acting injectable formulations of elsulfavirine and deselsulfavirine are under investigation.

In addition, Roche is investigating the use of elsulfavirin for the treatment of COVID-19 and it is currently in Phase II clinical trials for this possible indication.
