= Portmanteau inhibitor =

A portmanteau inhibitor is a drug that is a combination of two drug molecules, each of which is itself a type of inhibitor. The term was coined in 2007 by University of Minnesota researchers who designed and synthesized a combination HIV reverse transcriptase inhibitor and an integrase inhibitor, and was further used in 2011 by a team of researchers combining an integrase inhibitor with a CCR5 entry inhibitor.
