= Abacavir/lamivudine/zidovudine =

Mixture of chemical compounds

Combination of
- Abacavir sulfate: Nucleoside analogue reverse transcriptase inhibitor
- Lamivudine: Nucleoside analogue reverse transcriptase inhibitor
- Zidovudine: Nucleoside analogue reverse transcriptase inhibitor

Clinical data
- Trade names: Trizivir
- AHFS/Drugs.com: Professional Drug Facts
- MedlinePlus: a616051
- License data: US DailyMed: Trizivir
- Pregnancy category: AU: B3
- Routes of administration: By mouth
- ATC code: J05AR04 (WHO)

Legal status
- Legal status: AU: S4 (Prescription only); CA: Schedule IV; UK: POM (Prescription only); US: ℞-only; EU: Rx-only; In general: ℞ (Prescription only)

Identifiers
- CAS Number: 136470-78-5
- PubChem CID: 468908
- ChemSpider: 21106400
- KEGG: D10838
- NIAID ChemDB: 058986

Abacavir/lamivudine/zidovudine, sold under the brand name Trizivir, is a fixed-dose combination antiretroviral medication for the treatment of HIV/AIDS. It contains three reverse transcriptase inhibitors patented by GlaxoSmithKline and marketed by a joint venture with Pfizer, ViiV Healthcare:

- abacavir sulfate (ABC)
- lamivudine (3TC)
- zidovudine (AZT or ZDV)

It is indicated in the treatment of AIDS/HIV-1. For this purpose, the combination is very useful in pregnant women to decrease the risk of mother-to-child transmission.

The most common effects include headache and nausea.

Abacavir/lamivudine/zidovudine was approved for use in the United States and the European Union in 2000. In December 2013, Lupin Limited launched a generic version of abacavir/lamivudine/zidovudine.

== Side effects ==
The most common side effects of abacavir/lamivudine/zidovudine include nausea, vomiting, diarrhea, fatigue, paresthesia and headache. As with many medications targeting reverse transcriptase, body fat redistribution syndrome may occur, causing body fat to center on the upper back and neck, breast, and torso, and potentially decreasing around the legs, arms, and face. IRIS may occur which is when the immune system initially improves, but then deteriorates as a previously ignored infection becomes active. Other serious side effects include:

- Increased risk of heart attack
- Lactic acidosis
- Severe hepatomegaly
- Lipoatrophy
- Neutropenia
- Anemia
- Hypersensitivity reactions
  - Includes liver failure, renal failure, anaphylaxis, hypotension, and death.

== See also ==
- Abacavir/lamivudine
- Abacavir/dolutegravir/lamivudine
