= Coblopasvir =

Drug for the treatment of hepatitis C

Legal status
- Legal status: In general: ℞ (Prescription only)

Identifiers
- IUPAC name: Methyl N-[(2S)-1-[(2S)-2-[5-[4-[7-[2-[(2S)-1-[(2S)-2-(methoxycarbonylamino)-3-methylbutanoyl]pyrrolidin-2-yl]-1H-imidazol-5-yl]-1,3-benzodioxol-4-yl]phenyl]-1H-imidazol-2-yl]pyrrolidin-1-yl]-3-methyl-1-oxobutan-2-yl]carbamate
- CAS Number: 1312608-46-0
- PubChem CID: 58316387
- DrugBank: DB15315
- ChemSpider: 75531292
- UNII: 67XWL3R65W
- KEGG: D12247

Chemical and physical data
- Formula: C_{41}H_{50}N_{8}O_{8}
- Molar mass: 782.899 g·mol^{−1}
- InChI: InChI=InChI=1S/C41H50N8O8/c1-22(2)32(46-40(52)54-5)38(50)48-17-7-9-30(48)36-42-19-28(44-36)25-13-11-24(12-14-25)26-15-16-27(35-34(26)56-21-57-35)29-20-43-37(45-29)31-10-8-18-49(31)39(51)33(23(3)4)47-41(53)55-6/h11-16,19-20,22-23,30-33H,7-10,17-18,21H2,1-6H3,(H,42,44)(H,43,45)(H,46,52)(H,47,53)/t30-,31-,32-,33-/m0/s1; Key:JBYJTCVXUMWTJJ-YRCZKMHPSA-N

Coblopasvir is a pharmaceutical drug for the treatment of hepatitis C. It is a pan-genotypic inhibitor of HCV nonstructural protein 5A.

In China, it is approved for use in combination with sofosbuvir for treating naïve or interferon‐experienced adults chronically monoinfected patients with HCV of genotype 1, 2, 3 and 6, with or without compensated cirrhosis.
