= Moroxydine =

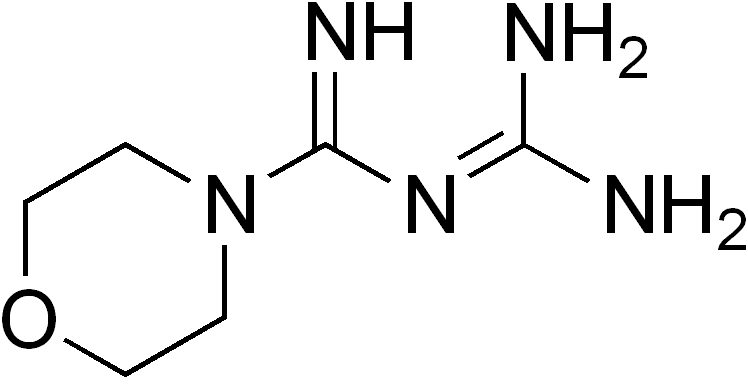

Names
- IUPAC name N-(Diaminomethylidene)morpholine-4-carboximidamide
- Other names Moroxidine

Identifiers
CAS Number	3731-59-7
3D model (JSmol)	Interactive image
ChemSpider	64715
ECHA InfoCard	100.020.994
EC Number	223-093-1
KEGG	D07250
PubChem CID	71655
UNII	O611591WAH
CompTox Dashboard (EPA)	DTXSID3048526
- InChI: InChI=1S/C6H13N5O/c7-5(8)10-6(9)11-1-3-12-4-2-11/h1-4H2,(H5,7,8,9,10) Key: KJHOZAZQWVKILO-UHFFFAOYSA-N; InChI=1/C6H13N5O/c7-5(8)10-6(9)11-1-3-12-4-2-11/h1-4H2,(H5,7,8,9,10) Key: KJHOZAZQWVKILO-UHFFFAOYAH
- SMILES: C1COCCN1C(=N)N=C(N)N

Properties
Chemical formula	C_{6}H_{13}N_{5}O
Molar mass	171.20 g/mol

Pharmacology
ATC code	J05AX01 (WHO)
- Except where otherwise noted, data are given for materials in their standard state (at 25 °C [77 °F], 100 kPa). verify (what is ?) Infobox references

Moroxydine is an antiviral drug that was originally developed in the 1950s as an influenza treatment. It has potential applications against a number of RNA and DNA viruses. Structurally moroxydine is a heterocyclic biguanidine.

It was reported in March 2014 that three kindergartens in two provinces of China had been found to be secretly dosing their students with moroxydine hydrochloride to try to prevent them from becoming ill. The kindergartens are paid only for the days that pupils attend and wanted to ensure that they maximised their earnings. In 2019, the Food and Drug Administration discovered the presence of moroxydine in a male enhancement product that was already found to contain undeclared sildenafil.
