= Efavirenz =

Antiretroviral medication

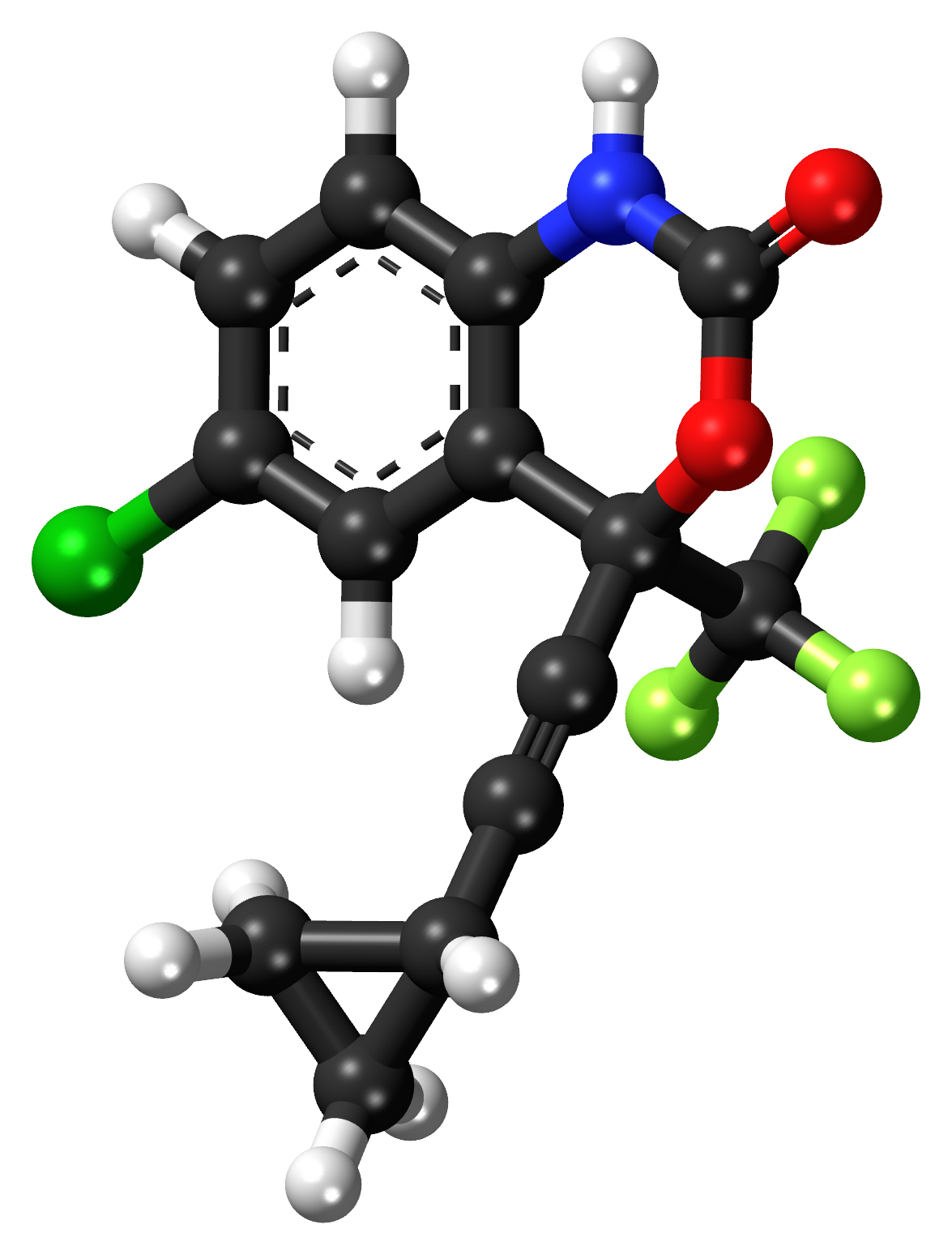

Clinical data
- Pronunciation: /ɪˈfævɪrɛnz/ i-FAV-i-renz or /ˌɛfəˈvaɪrɛnz/ EF-ə-VY-renz
- Trade names: Sustiva, Stocrin, others
- Other names: EFV
- AHFS/Drugs.com: Monograph
- MedlinePlus: a699004
- License data: US DailyMed: Efavirenz
- Pregnancy category: AU: D
- Routes of administration: By mouth (capsules, tablets)
- ATC code: J05AG03 (WHO)

Legal status
- Legal status: AU: S4 (Prescription only); CA: ℞-only; UK: POM (Prescription only); US: ℞-only; EU: Rx-only; In general: ℞ (Prescription only)

Pharmacokinetic data
- Bioavailability: 40–45% (under fasting conditions)
- Protein binding: 99.5–99.75%
- Metabolism: Liver (CYP2A6 and CYP2B6-mediated)
- Onset of action: 3–5 hours
- Elimination half-life: Single-dose: 52–76 h Multi-dose: 40–55 h
- Excretion: Kidney (14–34%) and feces (16–61%)

Identifiers
- IUPAC name: (4S)-6-Chloro-4-(2-cyclopropylethynyl)-4-(trifluoromethyl)-2,4-dihydro-1H-3,1-benzoxazin-2-one
- CAS Number: 154598-52-4
- PubChem CID: 64139
- DrugBank: DB00625
- ChemSpider: 57715
- UNII: JE6H2O27P8
- KEGG: D00896
- ChEBI: CHEBI:119486
- ChEMBL: ChEMBL223228
- NIAID ChemDB: 032934
- PDB ligand: EFZ (PDBe, RCSB PDB)
- CompTox Dashboard (EPA): DTXSID9046029
- ECHA InfoCard: 100.149.346

Chemical and physical data
- Formula: C_{14}H_{9}ClF_{3}NO_{2}
- Molar mass: 315.68 g·mol^{−1}
- 3D model (JSmol): Interactive image
- SMILES: O=C1Nc2ccc(Cl)cc2[C@@](C#CC2CC2)(C(F)(F)F)O1
- InChI: InChI=1S/C14H9ClF3NO2/c15-9-3-4-11-10(7-9)13(14(16,17)18,21-12(20)19-11)6-5-8-1-2-8/h3-4,7-8H,1-2H2,(H,19,20)/t13-/m0/s1; Key:XPOQHMRABVBWPR-ZDUSSCGKSA-N

Efavirenz (EFV), sold under the brand names Sustiva among others, is an antiretroviral medication used to treat and prevent HIV/AIDS. It is generally recommended for use with other antiretrovirals. It may be used for prevention after a needlestick injury or other potential exposure. It is sold both by itself and in combination as efavirenz/emtricitabine/tenofovir. It is taken by mouth.

Common side effects include rash, nausea, headache, feeling tired, and trouble sleeping. Some of the rashes may be serious such as Stevens–Johnson syndrome. Other serious side effects include depression, thoughts of suicide, liver problems, and seizures. It is not safe for use during pregnancy. It is a non-nucleoside reverse transcriptase inhibitor (NNRTI) and works by blocking the function of reverse transcriptase.

Efavirenz was approved for medical use in the United States in 1998, and in the European Union in 1999. It is on the World Health Organization's List of Essential Medicines. As of 2016, it is available as a generic medication.

== Medical uses ==
For HIV infection that has not previously been treated, the United States Department of Health and Human Services Panel on Antiretroviral Guidelines recommends the use of efavirenz in combination with tenofovir/emtricitabine (Truvada) as one of the preferred NNRTI-based regimens in adults and adolescents and children.

Efavirenz is also used in combination with other antiretroviral agents as part of an expanded post-exposure prophylaxis regimen to reduce the risk of HIV infection in people exposed to a significant risk (e.g. needlestick injuries, certain types of unprotected sex, etc.).

=== Pregnancy and breastfeeding ===
Efavirenz is safe to use during the first trimester of pregnancy. Efavirenz passes into breast milk and breast-fed infants may be exposed to efavirenz.

== Contraindications ==
People who have taken this medication before and experienced an allergic reaction should avoid taking further efavirenz dosages. Hypersensitivity reactions include Stevens–Johnson syndrome, toxic skin eruptions, and erythema multiforme.

== Adverse effects ==
Neuropsychiatric effects are the most common adverse effects, and include disturbed sleep (including nightmares, insomnia, disrupted sleep, and daytime fatigue), dizziness, headaches, vertigo, blurred vision, anxiety, and cognitive impairment (including fatigue, confusion, and memory and concentration problems), and depression, including suicidal thinking. Some people experience euphoria.

Rash and nausea may occur.

Use of efavirenz can produce a false positive result in some urine tests for marijuana.

Efavirenz may lengthen the QT interval so should not be used in people with or at risk of torsades de pointes.

Efavirenz may cause convulsions in adult and pediatric populations who have a history of seizures.

== Interactions ==
Efavirenz is broken down in the liver by enzymes that belong to the cytochrome P450 system, which include both CYP2B6 and CYP3A4. Efavirenz is a substrate of these enzymes and can decrease the metabolism of other drugs that require the same enzymes. However, efavirenz also induces these enzymes, which means the enzyme activity is enhanced and the metabolism of other drugs broken down by CYP2B6 and CYP3A4 can be increased. People who are taking both efavirenz and other drugs metabolized by the same enzymes might need the dose of their drugs to be increased or decreased.

One group of drugs that efavirenz affects is protease inhibitors, which are used for HIV/AIDS. Efavirenz will lower the blood levels of most protease inhibitors, including amprenavir, atazanavir, and indinavir. At lowered levels, protease inhibitors may not be effective in people taking both drugs, which means the virus that causes HIV/AIDS won't be stopped from replicating and may become resistant to the protease inhibitor.

Efavirenz also affects antifungal drugs, which are used for fungal infections such as urinary tract infections. Similar to the effect seen with protease inhibitors, efavirenz lowers the blood levels of antifungal drugs like voriconazole, itraconazole, ketoconazole, and posaconazole. As a result of lowered levels, antifungal drugs may not be effective in people taking both drugs, which means that the fungi that cause the infection may become resistant to the antifungal.

Efavirenz has also been reported to interact with tubulin and inhibit its polymerization.

== Pharmacology ==
=== Pharmacodynamics ===
==== Anti-hiv effects ====
Efavirenz falls in the NNRTI class of antiretrovirals. Both nucleoside and non-nucleoside RTIs inhibit the same target, the reverse transcriptase enzyme, an essential viral enzyme which transcribes viral RNA into DNA. Unlike nucleoside RTIs, which bind at the enzyme's active site, NNRTIs act allosterically by binding to a distinct site away from the active site known as the NNRTI pocket.

Efavirenz is not effective against HIV-2, as the pocket of the HIV-2 reverse transcriptase has a different structure, which confers intrinsic resistance to the NNRTI class.

As most NNRTIs bind within the same pocket, viral strains which are resistant to efavirenz are usually also resistant to the other NNRTIs, nevirapine and delavirdine. The most common mutation observed after efavirenz treatment is K103N, which is also observed with other NNRTIs. Nucleoside reverse-transcriptase inhibitors (NRTIs) and efavirenz have different binding targets, so cross-resistance is unlikely; the same is true with regard to efavirenz and protease inhibitors.

==== Neuropsychiatric effects ====
Efavirenz has been found to have affinity for a variety of targets to varying degrees and appears to act as an antagonist of the serotonin 5-HT_{2A} (specifically G_{q} signaling), 5-HT_{2B}, 5-HT_{2C}, and 5-HT_{3} receptors, as an inverse agonist of the serotonin 5-HT_{6} receptor, as a dual GABA_{A} receptor positive allosteric modulator and orthosteric site antagonist, as a serotonin–dopamine reuptake inhibitor (SDRI), as a vesicular monoamine transporter 2 (VMAT2) inhibitor, as a monoamine oxidase inhibitor (MAOI) of MAO-A, and as an antagonist of the muscarinic acetylcholine M_{1} and M_{3} receptors. Efavirenz produces the head-twitch response, a behavioral proxy of serotonergic psychedelic effects, in animals, and can partially substitute for LSD and MDMA in animal drug discrimination tests. Induction of the head-twitch response and substitution for LSD by efavirenz can be abolished by serotonin 5-HT_{2A} receptor antagonists or serotonin 5-HT_{2A} receptor knockout. Efavirenz does not substitute for cocaine or carisoprodol. The drug is not self-administered and does not produce conditioned place preference (CPP) in animals.

As of 2016 the mechanism of efavirenz's neuropsychiatric adverse effects was not clear. It appears to produce neurotoxicity, possibly by interfering with mitochondrial function, which may in turn possibly be caused by inhibiting creatine kinase but also possibly by disrupting mitochondrial membranes or by interfering with nitric oxide signalling. Some neuropsychiatric adverse effects may be mediated through cannabinoid receptors, or through activity at the serotonin 5-HT_{2A} receptor, but efavirenz interacts with many central nervous system targets, so this is not clear. The neuropsychiatric adverse effects are dose-dependent. Although efavirenz appears to act as a serotonin 5-HT_{2A} receptor antagonist, it has been suggested that it might exert functional selectivity and act as an agonist of the receptor for certain signaling pathways, which could in turn explain its hallucinogenic and LSD-like effects. However, this hypothesis remains to be evaluated. Conversely, research suggests that efavirenz may actually be a partial agonist of the serotonin 5-HT_{2A} receptor. The effects of efavirenz in animals and humans are consistent with it being a serotonergic psychedelic.

In animal models of human sporadic Creutzfeldt-Jakob disease (sCJD), oral, low-dose treatment with efavirenz has been shown to slow disease progression and significantly prolong survival. The drug acts as an allosteric activator of the brain-specific cholesterol-metabolizing enzyme CYP46A1, which enhances brain cholesterol turnover, reduces pathological prion protein (PrPSc) accumulation, and mitigates metabolic lipid alterations in the brain. Overexpression of CYP46A1 mirrors these protective effects, confirming that the drug's anti-prion mechanics are directly tied to brain cholesterol regulation.

=== Pharmacokinetics ===
The onset of action of efavirenz is 3 to 5 hours and its elimination half-life is 52 to 76 hours with a single dose and 40 to 55 hours with continuous administration. The shorter half-life with chronic administration may be due to induction of cytochrome P450 enzymes by efavirenz.

== Chemistry ==
Efavirenz is chemically described as (4S)-6-chloro-4-(2-cyclopropylethynyl)-4-(trifluoromethyl)-1H-3,1-benzoxazin-2-one. Its empirical formula is C_{14}H_{9}ClF_{3}NO_{2}. Efavirenz is a white to slightly pink crystalline powder with a molecular mass of 315.68 g/mol. It is practically insoluble in water (<10 μg/mL).

== History ==
Efavirenz was approved by the FDA on 21 September 1998.

On 17 February 2016, the FDA approved the generic tablet formulation to be produced by Mylan.

In late 2018, Thailand's Government Pharmaceutical Organization (GPO) announced that it will produce efavirenz after receiving WHO approval.

Efavirenz code name is DMP 266, discovered by Du pont Pharma. European countries are set to receive the license for manufacturing of Efavirenz in May 1999.

== Society and culture ==
=== Pricing information ===
A one-month supply of 600 mg tablets costs approximately US$1,010 in July 2016. In 2007, Merck provided Efavirenz in certain developing countries and countries largely affected by HIV for about US$0.65 per day. Some emerging countries have opted to purchase Indian generics.

In Thailand, a one-month supply of efavirenz + Truvada, as of June 2012, cost 2,900 baht (US$90), and there is a social program for patients who cannot afford the medication. As of 2018 Thailand will produce efavirenz domestically. Its Government Pharmaceutical Organization product costs 180 baht per bottle of thirty 600 mg tablets. The imported version in Thailand retails for more than 1,000 baht per bottle. GPO will devote 2.5 percent of its manufacturing capacity to make 42 million efavirenz pills in 2018, allowing it to serve export markets as well as domestic. The Philippines alone will order about 300,000 bottles of efavirenz for 51 million baht.

In South Africa, a license has been granted to generics giant Aspen Pharmacare to manufacture, and distribute to sub-Saharan Africa, a cost-effective antiretroviral drug.

=== Recreational use ===
Abuse of efavirenz by crushing and smoking the tablets for supposed hallucinogenic and dissociative effects has been reported in South Africa, where it is used in a mixture known as whoonga and nyaope. Researcher Hamilton Morris described efavirenz as "classically psychedelic."

=== Brands ===
As of 2016, efavirenz is marketed in various jurisdictions under the brand names Adiva, Avifanz, Efamat, Efatec, Efavir, Efavirenz, Efcure, Eferven, Efrin, Erige, Estiva, Evirenz, Filginase, Stocrin, Sulfina V, Sustiva, Virorrever, and Zuletel.

As of 2016, the combination of efavirenz, tenofovir, and emtricitabine is marketed in various jurisdictions under the brand names Atripla, Atroiza, Citenvir, Oditec, Teevir, Trustiva, Viraday, and Vonavir.

As of 2016, the combination of efavirenz, tenofovir, and lamivudine is marketed under the brand name Eflaten.
