= Raphamin =

Antiviral medication

Raphamin is a drug developed as an antiviral. It is manufactured by the Russian company Materia Medica.
