= Lamivudine/zidovudine =

Combination drug for HIV

Combination of
- Lamivudine: Nucleoside analogue reverse transcriptase inhibitor
- Zidovudine: Nucleoside analogue reverse transcriptase inhibitor

Clinical data
- Trade names: Combivir
- AHFS/Drugs.com: Professional Drug Facts
- MedlinePlus: a601066
- License data: US DailyMed: Lamivudine and zidovudine
- Pregnancy category: AU: B3
- Routes of administration: By mouth
- ATC code: J05AR01 (WHO)

Legal status
- Legal status: UK: POM (Prescription only); US: ℞-only; EU: Rx-only; In general: ℞ (Prescription only)

Identifiers
- CAS Number: 165456-81-5
- PubChem CID: 160352
- ChemSpider: 21106283
- KEGG: D07507
- NIAID ChemDB: 031479
- CompTox Dashboard (EPA): DTXSID90167954

Lamivudine/zidovudine, sold under the brand name Combivir among others, is a fixed-dose combination antiretroviral medication used to treat HIV/AIDS. It contains two antiretroviral medications, lamivudine and zidovudine. It is used together with other antiretrovirals. It is taken by mouth twice a day.

Common side effects include headache, feeling tired, nausea, diarrhea, and fever. Severe side effects may include bone marrow suppression, muscle damage, worsening of hepatitis B if previously infected, high blood lactate and liver enlargement. It may be part of a recommended treatment during pregnancy. The medications are both of the nucleoside reverse transcriptase inhibitor (NRTI) class. They work by blocking the action of the enzyme, reverse transcriptase, that the virus requires to reproduce.

Lamivudine/zidovudine was approved for medical use in the United States in 1997, and in the European Union in 1998. It is on the World Health Organization's List of Essential Medicines. It is available as a generic medication.

== Medical uses ==
It is indicated for use in combination with an additional antiretroviral agent for the treatment of human immunodeficiency virus type 1 (HIV-1) infection.

=== Pregnancy ===
Lamividine/zidovudine is categorized pregnancy category C in the United States, meaning there are potential risks to the baby during pregnancy, but potential benefits may outweigh the risks. Data supports the safety of this combination during pregnancy and is often preferred over other fixed dose combinations during pregnancy.

== Side effects ==
The most common adverse effects of Lamividine/zidovudine are similar to other NRTI's and includes headache, neutropenia, anemia, nausea, vomiting, myopathy and nail pigmentation. More serious and potentially life-threatening adverse effects reported include lactic acidosis with hepatic steatosis, but this rare adverse event is mostly associated with Zidovudine. HIV-positive patients with chronic hepatitis B virus (HBV) infections are at risk for potential flares of hepatitis that can occur with abrupt discontinuation of Lamividine/zidovudine because Lamivudine is also used in low doses for treatment against active HBV.

== Interactions ==
=== Drug-drug interactions ===
Lamividine/zidovudine interacts with stavudine and zalcitabine by competing intracellularly for activation and results in inhibiting phosphorylation. There is also a known interaction with nephrotoxic or bone marrow suppressive agents (e.g. doxorubicin) which increases the risk of hematologic toxicity of zidovudine. Monitoring renal function and hematologic tests can be used to assess these potential interactions.

=== Drug-food interactions ===
Half lives of lamivudine and Zidovudine are not affected by food and absorption rates were slowed when taken with food but were not clinically significant, therefore, lamivudine/zidovudine may be taken with or without food.

== Mechanism of action ==
The combination of lamivudine and zidovudine is composed of two nucleotide reverse transcriptase inhibitors (NRTIs).

Lamivudine and zidovudine both competitively inhibit and reduce the activity of reverse transcriptase (RT) causing HIV infected cells to decrease the number of viruses in the body. Lamivudine and zidovudine act as nucleoside analogs, which are substrates for the human nucleoside kinases. The initial phosphorylation step is crucial for the drug's activity, then converted into the active 5'-triphosphate form by host kinases. The drug is then incorporated to the end of the growing chain of the viral DNA causing the chain to be terminated, where nucleotides can no longer be added to the growing viral DNA.

Lamividuine and zidovudine combination therapy is believed to work synergistically together to prevent mutations in the HIV virus, which can contribute to drug resistance.

== Pharmacokinetics ==
Lamivudine is well absorbed in the body and distributes widely into the extravascular space. Oral bioavailability is >80% and overall metabolism is insignificant where approximately 95% of the drug is found unchanged in the urine. The only known metabolite found in humans is trans-sulfoxide. The half-life of lamivudine is 10 to 15 hours and binds poorly to plasma proteins.

Zidovudine is also well absorbed in the body and penetrates into the cerebrospinal fluid. Oral bioavailability is 75% and primarily metabolized by the liver by glucuronidation. The primary metabolite is GZDV, an inactive metabolite produced after first pass metabolism. The half-life of zidovudine is 0.5 to 3 hours and binds poorly to plasma proteins.

Lamivudine and zidovudine are not extensively metabolized by CYP450 liver enzymes.

== History ==
Lamivudine/zidovudine (brand name Combivir) was introduced to the market with FDA approval in 1997. Its impact in history is significant as it was the first combination therapy with a fixed dose for HIV-positive people, and soon solidified its title as a gold standard as it was the most prescribed NRTI in initial HIV treatment for newly diagnosed patients. The arrival of Combivir was seen as a new revolution in HIV therapy, with its improved toxicity profile and tolerability, especially compared to the undesirable side effects of lone AZT therapy or the unfavorable facial and lipoatrophy seen in Stavudine monotherapy at that time.

== Society and culture ==
Lamivudine/zidovudine is on the World Health Organization's List of Essential Medicines.

=== Drug formulations ===
Drug formulations: tablets by mouth

1. Combivir: lamivudine 150 mg and zidovudine 300 mg (scored). It is marketed by ViiV Healthcare.
2. Generic: lamivudine 150 mg and zidovudine 300 mg.
