= Doravirine/lamivudine/tenofovir =

Combination drug for HIV

Combination of
- Doravirine: Non-nucleoside reverse transcriptase inhibitor
- Lamivudine: Nucleoside reverse transcriptase inhibitor
- Tenofovir disoproxil: Nucleotide reverse transcriptase inhibitor

Clinical data
- Trade names: Delstrigo
- Other names: MK-1439A
- AHFS/Drugs.com: Monograph
- MedlinePlus: a618049
- License data: US DailyMed: Delstrigo
- Routes of administration: By mouth
- ATC code: J05AR24 (WHO)

Legal status
- Legal status: AU: S4 (Prescription only); CA: ℞-only; UK: POM (Prescription only); US: ℞-only; EU: Rx-only

Identifiers
- CAS Number: 2446159-50-6
- KEGG: D11396

Doravirine/lamivudine/tenofovir (DOR/3TC/TDF), sold under the brand name Delstrigo, is a fixed-dose combination antiretroviral medication for the treatment of HIV/AIDS. It contains doravirine, lamivudine, and tenofovir disoproxil. It is taken by mouth.

In the United States, it was approved by the Food and Drug Administration (FDA) for the treatment of HIV-1 infection in August 2018.
