= Nevirapine =

Chemical compound

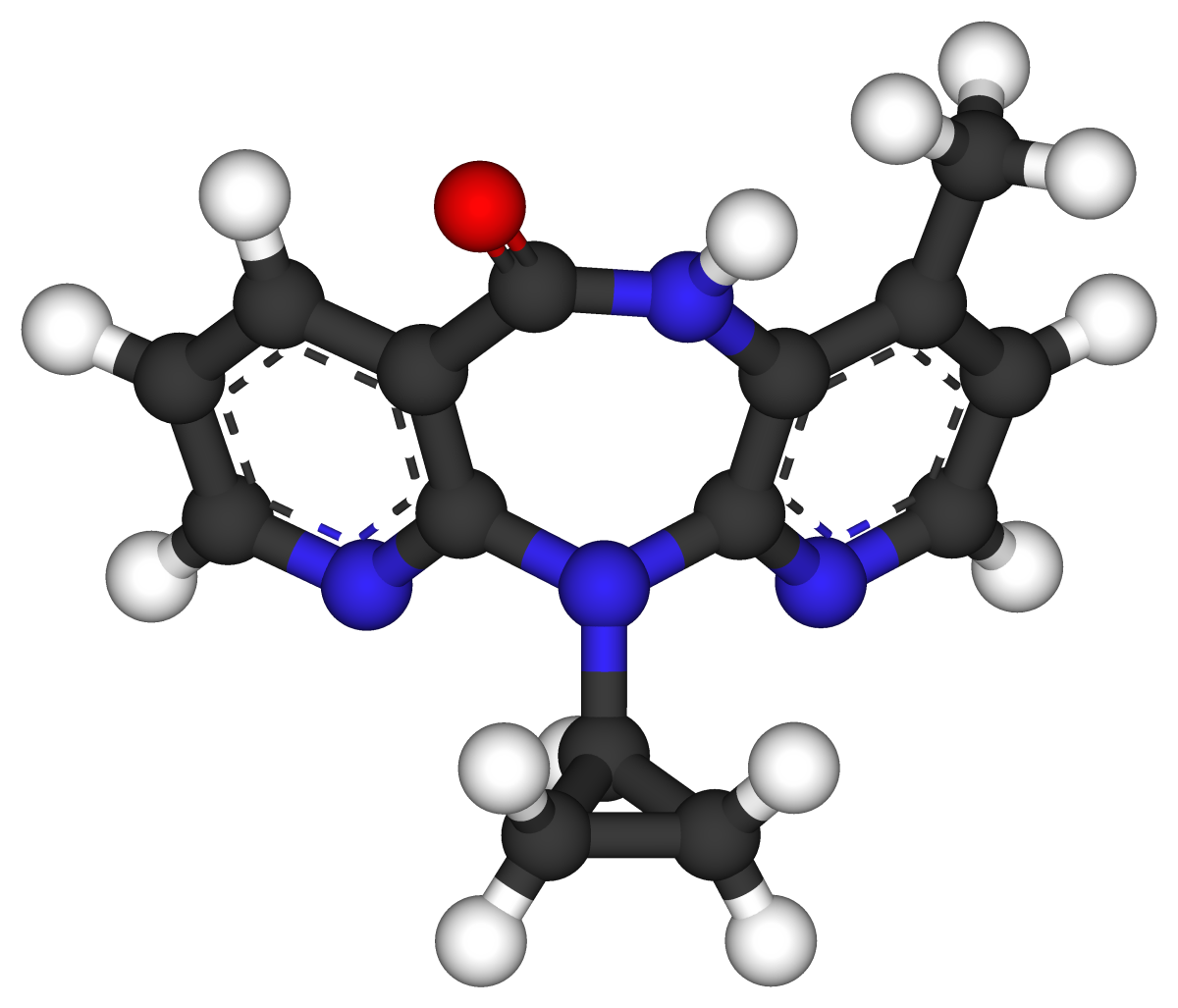

Clinical data
- Pronunciation: /nəˈvirəpiːn/ nə-VIR-ə-peen
- Trade names: Viramune
- AHFS/Drugs.com: Monograph
- MedlinePlus: a600035
- License data: US DailyMed: Nevirapine
- Pregnancy category: AU: B3
- Routes of administration: By mouth
- ATC code: J05AG01 (WHO)

Legal status
- Legal status: AU: S4 (Prescription only); US: ℞-only; EU: Rx-only

Pharmacokinetic data
- Bioavailability: 93% ± 9%
- Metabolism: Liver
- Elimination half-life: 45 hours
- Excretion: Kidney: <6% (Parent drug); Bile duct <5% (Parent drug)

Identifiers
- IUPAC name: 11-cyclopropyl-4-methyl-5,11-dihydro-6H- dipyrido[3,2-b:2′,3′-e][1,4]diazepin-6-one
- CAS Number: 129618-40-2
- PubChem CID: 4463
- DrugBank: DB00238
- ChemSpider: 4308
- UNII: 99DK7FVK1H
- KEGG: D00435
- ChEMBL: ChEMBL57
- NIAID ChemDB: 001856
- CompTox Dashboard (EPA): DTXSID7031797
- ECHA InfoCard: 100.117.250

Chemical and physical data
- Formula: C_{15}H_{14}N_{4}O
- Molar mass: 266.304 g·mol^{−1}
- 3D model (JSmol): Interactive image
- SMILES: O=C2Nc1c(ccnc1N(c3ncccc23)C4CC4)C
- InChI: InChI=1S/C15H14N4O/c1-9-6-8-17-14-12(9)18-15(20)11-3-2-7-16-13(11)19(14)10-4-5-10/h2-3,6-8,10H,4-5H2,1H3,(H,18,20); Key:NQDJXKOVJZTUJA-UHFFFAOYSA-N

Nevirapine (NVP), sold under the brand name Viramune among others, is a medication used to treat and prevent HIV/AIDS, specifically HIV-1. It is generally recommended for use with other antiretroviral medications. It may be used to prevent mother to child spread during birth but is not recommended following other exposures. It is taken by mouth.

Common side effects include rash, headache, nausea, feeling tired, and liver problems. The liver problems and skin rash may be severe and should be checked for during the first few months of treatment. It appears to be safe for use during pregnancy. It is a non-nucleoside reverse transcriptase inhibitor (NNRTI) and works by blocking the function of reverse transcriptase.

Nevirapine was approved for medical use in the United States in 1996. It is on the World Health Organization's List of Essential Medicines. It is available as a generic medication.

== Medical uses ==
Nevirapine is used in people six years of age and older infected with HIV-1 as part of combination antiretroviral treatment (ART or cART). Monotherapy with nevirapine is not indicated due to rapid emergence of resistance.

Nevirapine in triple combination therapy has been shown to suppress viral load effectively when used as initial antiretroviral therapy (i.e., in antiretroviral-naive patients). Some clinical trials have demonstrated comparable HIV suppression with nevirapine-based regimens to that achieved with regimens based on a protease inhibitor (PI) or efavirenz.

This drug is generally only to be considered for use if the CD4 cell count is very low.

Although concerns have been raised about nevirapine-based regimens in those starting therapy with high viral load or low CD4 count, some analyses suggest that nevirapine may be effective in this group of people.

Nevirapine may also form a useful component of salvage regimens after virological failure, usually in combination with one or more PIs as well as nucleotide reverse transcriptase inhibitor (NRTIs), especially in those who have not previously taken an NNRTI.

Dosing in children is based on body surface area (BSA), however, weight-based dosing algorithms have been released. These guidelines include dosing algorithms for as young as newborn babies.

=== Preventing mother-to-child transmission ===
Although a single dose of nevirapine given to both mother and child reduced the rate of HIV transmission by almost 50% compared with a very short course of zidovudine (AZT) prophylaxis, in a clinical trial in Uganda, that trial was found in an Associated Press investigation to be riddled with "sloppy recordkeeping" and possibly fraud. A subsequent study in Thailand showed that prophylaxis with single-dose nevirapine in addition to zidovudine is more effective than zidovudine alone. These and other trials have led the World Health Organization to endorse the use of single-dose nevirapine prophylaxis in many developing world settings as a cost-effective way of reducing mother-to-child transmission. However, in the United States the Ugandan study was deemed flawed and as of 2006 the FDA has not approved of such nevirapine prophylaxis. However, supporters of HIVNET 012 experiment argued that the flaws in this experiment were largely due to bureaucratic incompetence, while the findings regarding the safety and efficacy of single-dose nevirapine from this study were scientifically solid and too important to discard. Moreover, it was argued that holding African researchers who operated under resource-poor situations to the same moral and procedural standards to their Western counterparts was unrealistic, and would further marginalize African researchers' role in the science community and impede the progress of African science. Another clinical trial, Using Nevirapine to Prevent Mother-to-Child HIV Transmission During Breastfeeding, was completed in September 2013.

A major concern with this approach is that NNRTI resistance mutations are commonly observed in both mothers and infants after single-dose nevirapine, and may compromise the response to future NNRTI-containing regimens. A short course of maternal Lamivudine/zidovudine is recommended by the U.S. Public Health Service Task Force to reduce this risk.

=== Nonoccupational Post-Exposure Prophylaxis ===
Nevirapine is contraindicated for non-occupational post-exposure-prophylaxis including for pregnant and nonpregnant women due to severe liver toxicity.

== Adverse effects ==
The most common adverse effect of nevirapine is the development of mild or moderate rash (13%). Severe or life-threatening skin reactions have been observed in 1.5% of patients, including Stevens–Johnson syndrome, toxic epidermal necrolysis and hypersensitivity.

Nevirapine may cause severe or life-threatening liver toxicity, usually emerging in the first six weeks of treatment. In 2000, the U.S. Food and Drug Administration issued a black box warning on nevirapine, warning that it could cause life-threatening liver toxicity and skin reactions. Unacceptably high risk of serious liver symptoms in certain patient groups (women with CD4 count >250 and men >400) has led the U.S. DHHS to recommend the restriction of nevirapine use to those at lower risk, unless the benefit to the patient clearly outweighs the risk; although in the 2NN study which found these CD4 limits, the effect was seen only in patients recruited from Thailand. More recent studies on the use of Nevirapine in people with higher CD4 cell counts have come to the following conclusion: Treatment-experienced patients who start NVP-based combination therapy with low pre–ART and high current CD4 cell counts and an undetectable VL have a similar likelihood for discontinuing NVP therapy because of hypersensitivity reactions (HSRs), compared with treatment-naive patients with low CD4 cell counts. This suggests that NVP-based combination therapy may be safely initiated in such patients. However, in similar patients with a detectable VL, it is prudent to continue to adhere to current CD4 cell count thresholds. The U.S. Public Health Service Task Force advocates caution in the use of nevirapine in pregnancy due to toxicity issues, which may be exacerbated during pregnancy.

Cases of immune reconstitution syndrome and fat redistribution have also been observed with this drug.

The U.S. Food and Drug Administration recommends stopping nevirapine if a person experiences:

- sign and symptoms of liver issues such as hepatitis
- increased transaminases in addition to rash or systemic symptoms
- formation of rash with systemic symptoms
- severe skin or hypersensitivity reactions

Additionally, the U.S. FDA recommends close monitoring during the first 6 weeks of therapy for the above symptoms as there is high risk during this time. Continued monitoring is recommended for up to the first 18 weeks of treatment. If a patient experiences hepatitis plus rash or other systemic symptoms, or severe hypersensitivity or skin rash, nevirapine should not be restarted.

== Drug interactions ==
Nevirapine is a substrate for liver CYP3A and CYP2B6 enzymes. Concomitant administration of drugs that are inhibitors of these enzymes may increase serum nevirapine levels significantly. Some examples of these drugs include ritonavir, fosamprenavir, and fluconazole. On the other hand, drugs that are inducers of these enzymes such as rifampicin may lower serum nevirapine levels.^{[18]}

In addition, concomitant use of St. John's wort (Hypericum perforatum, which has been shown to induce CYP3A4 and CYP1A2) or St. John's wort containing products may significantly lower nevirapine levels.

Nevirapine is an inducer of cytochrome P450 isoenzymes CYP3A4 and CYP2B6. It may reduce levels of several co-administered drugs including the antiretrovirals efavirenz, indinavir, lopinavir, nelfinavir and saquinavir, as well as clarithromycin, ketoconazole, forms of hormonal contraception, and methadone.

== Mechanism of action ==
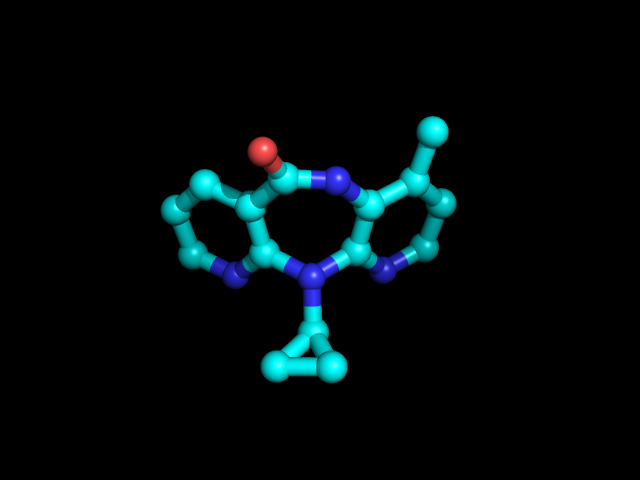
Nevirapine shown in ball and stick structure.

Nevirapine falls in the non-nucleoside reverse transcriptase inhibitor (NNRTI) class of antiretrovirals. Both nucleoside and non-nucleoside RTIs inhibit the same target, the reverse transcriptase enzyme, an essential viral enzyme which transcribes viral RNA into DNA. Unlike nucleoside RTIs, which bind at the polymerase active site, NNRTIs bind to a hydrophobic pocket in the subdomain of p66 which is about 10 angstrom away from the active site (known as the NNRTI pocket). Therefore, this NNRTI-binding pocket will inhibit reverse transcription in a way that is distinct to the NRTIs.

Nevirapine is not effective against HIV-2, as the pocket of the HIV-2 reverse transcriptase has a different structure, which confers intrinsic resistance to the NNRTI class.

Resistance to nevirapine develops rapidly if viral replication is not completely suppressed. The most common mutations observed after nevirapine treatment are Y181C and K103N, which are also observed with other NNRTIs. As all NNRTIs bind within the same pocket, viral strains which are resistant to nevirapine are usually also resistant to the other NNRTIs, efavirenz and delavirdine. However, second generation NNRTIs like rilpivirine and etravirine are effective in treatment for HIV strains resistant to nevirapine and other first generation drugs in that same class.

== History ==
Nevirapine was discovered by Karl D. Hargrave and colleagues at Boehringer Ingelheim Pharmaceuticals, Inc., one of the Boehringer Ingelheim group of companies. It is covered by U.S. Patent 5,366,972 and corresponding foreign patents. Nevirapine was the first NNRTI approved by the U.S. Food and Drug Administration (FDA). It was approved June 21, 1996 for adults and September 11, 1998, for children. It was also approved in Europe in 1997.

== Society and culture ==
Former U.S. President George W. Bush's PEPFAR funding of $500 million to help combat the African AIDS epidemic included nevirapine, among other medications and programs.

In South Africa, the Treatment Action Campaign successfully sued the government over its failure to make nevirapine widely available. In Minister of Health v Treatment Action Campaign the Constitutional Court of South Africa ordered the government to immediately "remove the restrictions that prevent Nevirapine from being made available for the purpose of reducing the risk of mother-to-child transmission of HIV at public hospitals and clinics that are not research and training sites [and] permit and facilitate the use of Nevirapine for the purpose of reducing the risk of mother-to-child transmission of HIV and to make it available for this purpose at hospitals and clinics when in the judgement of the attending medical practitioner acting in consultation with the medical superintendent of the facility concerned this is medically indicated, which shall if necessary include that the mother concerned has been appropriately tested and counselled."
