= NIAID ChemDB =

Biological database

ChemDB HIV, Opportunistic Infection and Tuberculosis Therapeutics Database
Content
- Description: Small molecules that have been tested against HIV and/or related opportunistic infections

Contact
- Research center: National Institute of Allergy and Infectious Diseases (NIAID)
- Release date: 1989

Access
- Website: http://chemdb.niaid.nih.gov/

The ChemDB HIV, Opportunistic Infection and Tuberculosis Therapeutics Database is a publicly available tool developed by the National Institute of Allergy and Infectious Diseases to compile preclinical data on small molecules with potential therapeutic action against HIV/AIDS and related opportunistic infections.

== Characteristics and content ==
Since 1989, the ChemDB has been updated with information extracted from peer-reviewed published literature, conference proceedings and patents. Data are compiled on compound structure, chemical properties, biological activity (e.g. targeted protein, IC50, EC50, Cytotoxicity, TI, Ki, and or MIC), and reference details (e.g. Author, Journal).

The ChemDB web interface supports searching of biological, textual and chemical data using Oracle Text, the Accelrys Direct chemical search engine, and ChemAxon’s Marvin tools. These tools allow web users to search the database by comparing the degree of similarity or flexibility match to chemical structures that have either been uploaded or drawn. Additional Boolean searches can be combined with structure search to include other fields on interest, including target organism or Lipinski score. In addition to the publicly available web interface, whole database downloads can be obtained by the scientific research community. The database is used frequently in peer-reviewed scientific research.

== Opportunistic pathogens ==
Opportunistic pathogens included in this database are:

- SIV
- FIV
- Human cytomegalovirus (HCMV)
- Epstein–Barr virus
- Herpes simplex virus 1
- Herpes simplex virus 2
- Kaposi sarcoma virus
- Hepatitis A virus
- Hepatitis B virus
- Hepatitis C virus
- Mycobacterium spp.
- Pneumocystis carinni
- Cryptococcus spp.
- Candida spp.
- Aspergillus spp.
- Microsporidia
- Toxoplasma gondii
- Cryptosporidium parvum
- Leishmania spp.
- Plasmodium spp.
