= Discovery and development of integrase inhibitors =

The first human immunodeficiency virus (HIV) case was reported in the United States in the early 1980s. Many drugs have been discovered to treat the disease, but mutations in the virus and resistance to the drugs make development difficult. Integrase is a viral enzyme that integrates retroviral DNA into the host cell genome. Integrase strand transfer inhibitors (INSTIs) are a class of antiretroviral drugs used in the treatment of HIV. Since the approval of the first INSTI, raltegravir, in 2007, five INSTIs have been introduced: raltegravir, elvitegravir, dolutegravir, bictegravir, and cabotegravir. Second-generation INSTIs — dolutegravir and bictegravir — are now the globally preferred backbone of first-line antiretroviral therapy, recommended by the World Health Organization (WHO), the National Institutes of Health (NIH), and other major clinical guidelines. As of 2024, more than 25 million people worldwide are receiving dolutegravir-based regimens. Key things to verify after pasting:

== History ==
The body uses its immune system to protect itself from bacteria, viruses, and other disease-causing pathogens; when it fails to do so, immunodeficiency diseases occur. One such disease is acquired immunodeficiency syndrome (AIDS), most commonly resulting from infection by the human immunodeficiency virus (HIV). Two closely related types of HIV have been identified: HIV-1 and HIV-2. HIV-1 is more virulent and is the predominant cause of AIDS worldwide, while HIV-2 is found primarily in West Africa. In most cases, people infected with HIV go on to develop AIDS and face life-threatening opportunistic infections or cancer without treatment.

Integration of the retroviral genome into the host cell is critical for gene expression and viral replication. The viral genome is reverse-transcribed into DNA by viral reverse transcriptase, then integrated into host-cell chromosomes by the viral integrase enzyme. Because HIV-1 integrase has no known cellular equivalent, it represents a highly selective target for antiretroviral drug design.

Many integrase inhibitors were discovered and designed, but only a few advanced to phase II or phase III clinical trials. In general, there are two main classes of integrase inhibitors: Integrase Strand Transfer Inhibitors (INSTIs) and Integrase Binding Inhibitors (INBIs). INSTIs block the strand transfer step of integration by chelating magnesium ions at the integrase active site, while INBIs block the binding of integrase to viral DNA.

=== First-generation INSTIs ===
Raltegravir (brand name Isentress) was the first INSTI and the first drug in an entirely new class of antiretrovirals to receive approval, granted by the U.S. Food and Drug Administration (FDA) in October 2007 and by the European Medicines Agency (EMA) in December 2007. It was initially marketed for HIV-1-infected adults with multi-drug resistance; a once-daily formulation was later approved in 2017. Raltegravir is an INSTI that inhibits both HIV-1 and HIV-2 replication but has a relatively low genetic barrier to resistance and remains the only INSTI not available as a fixed-dose combination.

Elvitegravir (EVG) was the second INSTI approved by the FDA in 2012, and was the first once-daily, fixed-dose combination single-tablet regimen containing an INSTI. Because elvitegravir requires co-administration with the pharmacokinetic booster cobicistat, it carries a higher potential for drug–drug interactions than other INSTIs. Like raltegravir, elvitegravir has a low genetic barrier to resistance and shares cross-resistance patterns with raltegravir.

=== Second-generation INSTIs ===
Dolutegravir (DTG, brand name Tivicay) was approved by the FDA in 2013 and represented a major advance over first-generation INSTIs due to its significantly higher genetic barrier to resistance, fewer drug–drug interactions, and once-daily dosing without a pharmacokinetic booster. Very few resistance-associated mutations have been observed with dolutegravir in clinical trials. It is available as part of a fixed-dose combination with tenofovir disoproxil fumarate and lamivudine (TLD), which the WHO recommends as the preferred first-line antiretroviral regimen for adults and adolescents worldwide, regardless of sex, family planning considerations, or hepatitis B co-infection. As of early 2024, more than 25 million people with HIV were receiving dolutegravir-based therapy, making TLD the most widely used antiretroviral regimen globally.

Bictegravir (BIC) was approved by the FDA in 2018 as part of the fixed-dose combination bictegravir/emtricitabine/tenofovir alafenamide (BIC/FTC/TAF, brand name Biktarvy). Bictegravir shares a similarly high genetic barrier to resistance with dolutegravir and is recommended alongside dolutegravir-based regimens as a preferred first-line option in the NIH and other major treatment guidelines. Week 144 data from phase 3 trials confirmed its non-inferiority to dolutegravir-based regimens in treatment-naïve individuals.

=== Long-acting and injectable INSTIs ===
Cabotegravir (CAB) represents the most recent advance in the INSTI class. It is approved in two distinct roles: (1) as a long-acting injectable antiretroviral treatment, administered intramuscularly in combination with rilpivirine on a monthly or bi-monthly basis (brand name Cabenuva), for virologically suppressed adults wishing to replace daily oral therapy; and (2) as long-acting injectable pre-exposure prophylaxis (PrEP), administered every two months, representing a major advance in HIV prevention for individuals who have difficulty adhering to daily oral PrEP. Clinical studies have associated long-acting cabotegravir with high treatment satisfaction. A notable concern is that individuals who acquire HIV while receiving long-acting cabotegravir PrEP may harbor resistance mutations to dolutegravir, a key component of WHO-recommended first-line ART regimens.

=== Resistance and safety considerations ===
Second-generation INSTIs have a substantially higher genetic barrier to resistance than first-generation agents. Resistance-associated mutations to dolutegravir and bictegravir are rarely observed in clinical practice, though cases of virologic failure have been documented, particularly in settings with suboptimal adherence. INSTIs are generally well tolerated, but emerging evidence indicates that second-generation INSTIs — particularly dolutegravir and bictegravir — are associated with greater weight gain compared to older antiretroviral classes, the long-term clinical implications of which warrant further study. Common adverse effects across the INSTI class include nausea, diarrhea, insomnia, fatigue, and headache, with low rates of treatment discontinuation.

== The HIV-1 integrase enzyme ==
The HIV-1 integrase (IN) is a key enzyme in the replication mechanism of retroviruses. It is responsible for the transfer of virally encoded DNA into the host chromosome which is a necessary event in retroviral replication. Since IN has no equivalent in the host cell, integrase inhibitors have a high therapeutic index as they do not interfere with normal cellular processes.

=== Structure ===
IN belongs, both mechanistically and structurally, to the superfamily of polynucleotidyl transferases 10 and is composed of 288 amino acids that form the 32 kDa protein. Retroviruses encode their enzymes (protease, reverse transcriptase and integrase) with the POL gene with the 3´end encoding for IN.

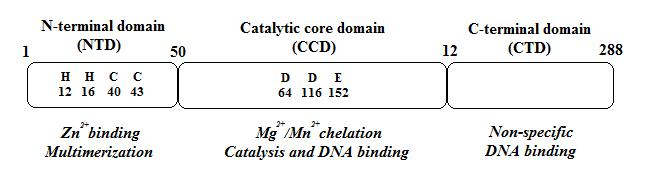
Figure 1: Structural domains of the HIV-1 integrase

IN is composed of 3 structurally independent, functional domains (see figure 1).:

1. The N-terminal domain (NTD) encompasses amino acids 1–50 and contains two histidine residues (His12 and His16) and two cysteine residues (Cys40 and Cys43), all of which are absolutely conserved and form a HHCC zinc-finger motif. Single mutations of any of these four residues reduce IN enzymatic activity. The HHCC zinc-finger motif chelates one zinc atom per IN monomer. The NTD is required for higher order multimer formation which appears to be its primary role. The multimerization requires zinc atom that stabilizes the fold.

2. The catalytic core domain (CCD), which encompasses amino acids 51- 212, contains the active site of IN but it can't catalyze integration in the absence of NTD and CTD (the C-terminal domain). CCD contains three absolutely conserved negatively charged amino acids; D64, D116 and E152. These amino acids form the DDE motif that coordinate divalent metal ions (Mg^{2+} or Mn^{2+}). These metal ions are essential for the catalysis of integration. CCD has a mixed β and α structure with five β-sheets and six α helices that are linked by flexible loops. The flexible loops allow conformational changes that are required for 3´processing of the viral DNA and strand transfer (STF) reactions which are two key steps of the integration reaction. CCD is essential for these steps and substitution of any of the residues in the DDE motif dramatically inhibits the activity of IN.

3. The C-terminal domain (CTD), which encompasses amino acids 213–288, binds DNA nonspecifically and its interaction with NTD and CCD is required for IN 3´-processing and strand-transfer activities. CTD is the least conserved of the three domains. IN acts as a multimer and dimerization is required for the 3´-processing step, with tetrameric IN catalyzing the strand-transfer reaction.

=== Function ===
HIV-1 integration occurs through a multistep process that includes two catalytic reactions: 3´endonucleolytic processing of proviral DNA ends (termed 3´processing) and integration of 3´-processed viral DNA into cellular DNA (referred to as strand transfer). In 3´processing IN binds to a short sequence located at either end of the long terminal repeat (LTR) of the viral DNA and catalyzes endonucleotide cleavage. This results in elimination of a dinucleotide from each of the 3´ends of the LTR. Cleaved DNA is then used as a substrate for integration or strand transfer. Strand transfer is a trans-esterification reaction involving a direct nucleophilic attack of the 3´hydroxy group of the two newly processed viral 3´-DNA ends on the phosphodiester backbone of the host target DNA. This leads to covalent insertion of viral DNA into the genome of the infected cell. Strand transfer occurs simultaneously at both ends of the viral DNA molecule, with an offset of precisely five base pairs between the two opposite points of insertion. The integration reaction is completed by removal of unpaired dinucleotides from the 5'- ends of the viral DNA, repair of the single-stranded gaps created between the viral and target DNA molecules and ligation of 3'-ends to 5'-ends of the host DNA. Divalent metals, Mg^{2+} or Mn^{2+}, are required for 3'-processing and strand transfer steps as well as for assembly of IN onto specific viral donor DNA to form a complex that is competent to carry out either function. Because the abundance of magnesium (Mg^{2+}) versus manganese (Mn ^{2+}) in human cells is 1,000,000-fold, magnesium seems a more readily available divalent cofactor for integration.

== Mechanism of action ==
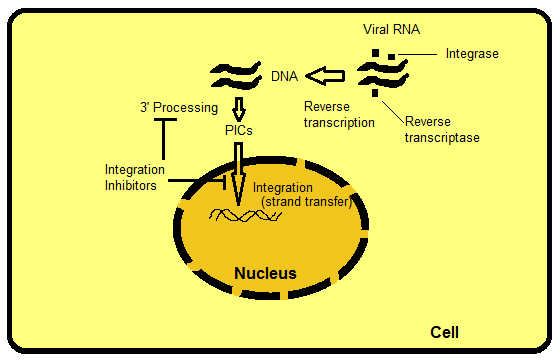
Figure 2: Integration of viral RNA into host cell DNA

There are several ways to target integrase but strand transfer inhibition is the most intuitively obvious and readily pursued to date. Other targets include, for example, the protein domains beyond the active site of IN. The domains interact with viral or host DNA and are important for binding to the enzyme. It is possible to hamper functions of the enzyme by disrupting or removing these bindings. PIC is a multimeric protein structure inside the host cell, composed of both viral and host proteins. Integrase is a part of PIC's viral component. PIC's viral and host proteins are believed to modulate intrinsic activity of the enzyme, shuttle PIC to the nucleus and direct integration of viral DNA into a transcriptionally active region of the host genome. If it were possible to exclude certain proteins from the PIC it would block the ability of the virus to integrate into the host genome. The process where the retroviral RNA is transcribed to DNA and then integrated into the host cell's genome is shown in figure 2.

=== IN strand transfer inhibitors (INSTIs) ===
Mg^{2+} and Mn^{2+} are critical cofactors in the integration phase. Inactivating these cofactors (e.g. through chelation) causes functional impairment of IN. This concept gives researchers the opportunity to design and develop highly efficient IN inhibitors (INIs). In fact, all small molecule HIV-1 INIs that are now being researched contain a structural motif that coordinates the two divalent magnesium ions in the enzyme's active site.

Raltegravir and elvitegravir share the same mechanism of action against integrase: to bind to the active site of Mg^{2+} ions. Competitive inhibitors compete directly with viral DNA for binding to integrase in order to inhibit 3‘-end processing. In doing this the inhibitors completely block the active site from binding to target DNA. This inhibition is called strand transfer inhibition.

=== Inhibition of the LEDGF/p75- integrase interaction ===
Lens epithelial derived growth factor (LEDGF/p75) is a host protein that binds to integrase and is crucial for viral replication. The mechanism of action is not precisely known but evidence suggest that LEDGF/p75 guides integrase to insert viral DNA into transcriptionally active sites of the host genome. Inhibitors of this protein are already being developed and patented. They are likely to be highly target specific and less prone to the development of resistance.

=== IN binding inhibitors ===
Another class of INIs could be IN binding inhibitors (INBIs) such as V-165. V-165 is a compound shown to inhibit integration but without obvious effect on viral DNA synthesis. When the mechanism of action was studied it showed that V-165 interferes with viral DNA-IN complex formation. Due to its interfering action it is classified as an IN binding inhibitor. Other compounds, such as styrylquinolines share similar mechanism by competing with the LTR substrate for IN binding.

== Drug design ==
=== Binding ===
INSTIs bind tightly and specifically to the IN that is associated with the ends of the DNA by chelating the divalent metal ions (Mg^{2+}) which is coordinated by the catalytic triad i.e. the DDE motif. The DDE motif is located in the CCD of IN and is the active site of the enzyme and hence INSTIs are so called active site inhibitors. INSTIs bind to a specific site close to the DDE motif of IN, a site that is present only in the conformation that occurs after processing of the 3´ viral DNA ends. Viral DNA may well form a part of the inhibitor binding site. The binding is a form of allosteric inhibition as it implies blockage of a specific integrase-viral DNA complex. This results in selective inhibition of the strand-transfer reaction, with no significant effect on the 3´-processing reaction. INSTIs may therefore be more specific and bind selectively to the target DNA binding site and hence be less toxic than bifunctional inhibitors that are able to bind to both the donor and target binding sites.

INBIs also bind to IN but the mechanism of action is unknown so the binding can not be detailed.

=== Structure activity relationship (SAR) ===
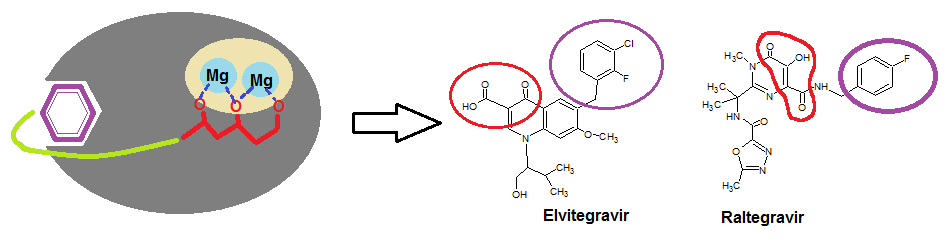
Figure 3: Structure activity relationship of elvitegravir and raltegravir. A benzyl group in a hydrophobic pocket and a triad to chelate the two Mg^{2+} ions.

Two structural components are necessary for integrase binding: a hydrophobic benzyl moiety that buries into a highly hydrophobic pocket near the active site; and chelating triad that binds with two Mg^{2+} ions in a rather hydrophilic region, anchoring the inhibitor onto the protein surface (see figure 3). In fact, all potent integrase inhibitors possess a substituted benzyl component that is critical for maintaining 3‘end joining potency. Removal of the benzyl group prevents inhibitory function. Lipophylic substituents are therefore beneficial for the strand transfer inhibition, in particular the thiophenyl, furanyl and (thiophen-2-yl)phenyl substitutions. Heteroaromatic amine and amide also cause increase in 3‘ processing inhibitory action.

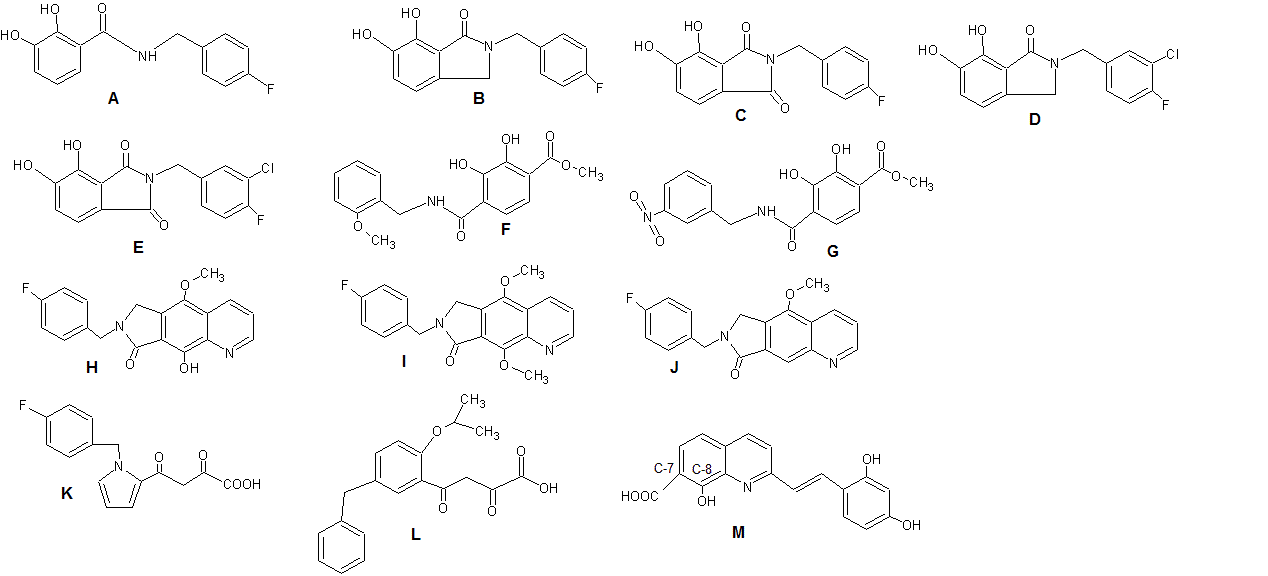
Figure 4: Examples of integrase inhibitors.

When catechol-based inhibitors of IN were researched it was observed that maintaining a planar relationship with the bis-hydroxylated aryl ring increases potency. The inhibitory activity could be further optimized by including a meta-chloro substituent, enhancing the interaction of the benzyl group with the adjacent hydrophobic pocket (see figure 4: Structures A-G).

A benzyl substituted hydroxyl group (fig. 4 H) improves metal-chelating capability (compared to structure J in fig. 4) while a methoxy group (I) is much less potent due to steric clash by the additional methyl group with the catalytic metals.

When researching diketo derivates, the central pyrrole ring of structure K in fig. 4 was replaced by a series of aromatic systems having various substitution patterns. That provided optimum relative orientation of the benzyl and diketoacid (DKA) site chain. Structure L in fig. 4 resulted in 100 fold increase in potency.

Benard et al. (2004) synthesized INIs with a quinoline subunit and an ancillary aromatic ring linked by functionalized spacers such as amide, hydrazide, urea and hydroxyprop-1-en-3-one moiety. They found that the amide group containing derivatives were the most promising ones. By synthesizing series of styrylquinones researchers found out that a carboxyl group at C-7, a hydroxylgroup at C-8 in the quinoline subunit and an ancillary phenyl ring (Figure 4: Structure M) are required for inhibition, although alterations of the ring are tolerated. Two hydroxyl groups on the ancillary phenyl ring are also required for inhibitory potency.

=== Pharmacophore ===
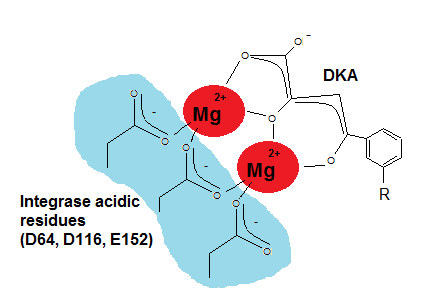
Figure 5: Binding of DKAs to DDE amino acid residues of integrase

Since critical structure information is scarce on HIV integrase catalysis it is difficult to find the exact pharmacophore for its inhibition. Wang et al. (2010) hoped that by studying the SAR and pharmacophore of a dual inhibitor scaffold, focusing both on integrase and reverse transcriptase (RT) it would be possible to observe anti-integrase activity. By studying the SAR of HIV integrase inhibitors it was possible to find that for optimal integrase inhibition the pharmacophore requires a regiospecific (N-1) DKA of a specific length. A DKA functionality or its heterocyclic bioisostere that selectively inhibit strand transfer seem to be present in all major chemotypes of integrase inhibitors. As detailed in the SAR discussion above the two necessary structural components of INI are a benzyl hydrophobic moiety and a chelating triad to bind the Mg^{2+} ions. For the triad to bind the Mg^{2+} ions has to be ionized (see fig. 5) and thus a pharmacophore bioisostere has to be ionized too and the benzyl pharmacophore bioisostere must to be very hydrophobic.

However, despite previous success in clinical development (raltegravir), a detailed binding model is lacking so it has proven difficult to structure base the design of integrase inhibitors. When the pharmacophore of salicylic acid and catechol were merged, new chemical scaffolds were created. The adjacent hydroxyl and carboxylic groups on salicylic acid could bind with the metal ions and serve as their pharmacophore. Polyhydroxylated aromatic inhibitors are mostly active against strand transfer reactions and 3‘-processing which suggests a mechanism that targets both steps. This is a very important part of the compound as it can be used to bind to the divalent metal on the active site of IN and as such be effective against viral strains that are resistant to strand transfer specific inhibitors.

=== Resistance ===
It has been discovered that over 60 variations of INSTI mutations cause in vivo and in vitro resistance. Due to these mutations and development of resistance the inhibitors are less effective against the virus. Resistance of INI corresponds to those of other ARV drugs. First IN resistance is caused by primary mutations that decrease INI sensitivity in combination with secondary mutations that further reduce virus sensitivity and/or repair decreased fitness of the virus. Secondly there is a genetic barrier to INI resistance, defined by the number of mutations required for the loss of clinical INI activity. Thirdly there is extensive but incomplete cross-resistance among the INIs. A loop containing amino acid residues 140–149 is located in the catalytic-core domain and is important for IN function as mentioned before. This loop is flexible and even though its role is not quite known it is thought to be important and its functions critical for DNA binding. This resistance appears within mutations in this IN-coding region. The resistance to raltegravir and elvitegravir is primarily due to the same two mutation pathways but other primary mutations are also involved for each of the drugs. Some mutations increase resistance to the drugs to a large extent than others. For example, one of the most common mutation pathway increases the resistance to raltegravir up to 100 times more than the second most common one. Resistance to Integrase Inhibitor S/GSK1349572 is still being developed and the resistance has not been fully characterized. When it was assessed alongside the primary mutations of raltegravir and elvitegravir it did not show cross-resistance which means that it could be useful against drug resistant viruses. Raltegravir has limited intestinal absorption and thus resistance cannot be overcome by prescribing higher doses. Newer drugs are warranted to overcome this pharmacological disadvantage and gain plasma concentrations high enough to target raltegravir-resistant viruses.

== Current status ==
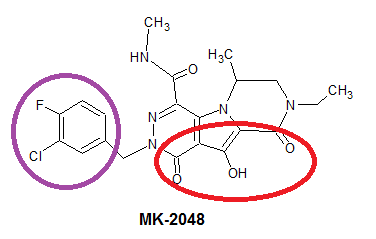
Figure 6: Structure of MK-2048 with important pharmacophore highlighted

The search for new ways to improve treatment of patients infected with HIV is constant. Considering the experience that has been gathered since the 1980s of ARV drug development arrival of INSTIs as a new potent class of ARV signals a new era in the treatment of HIV. Development of a successful INSTI treatment was accomplished when raltegravir was discovered by Merck Sharp & Dohme Limited. A conditional marketing authorization was licensed in December 2007 by the European Commission which was valid throughout the European Union. In 2009 this authorization was converted to a full marketing authorization and in the same year the FDA changed the approval from accelerated to traditional approval and listed the drug as a first line ARV treatment agent. The second INSTI drug, elvitegravir, was identified by Japan Tobacco and clinical trials began in 2005. In 2011 the drug was still in phase three clinical trials, where it is being compared to raltegravir, in treatment experienced subjects and is also in phase two development in naïve subjects as a part of a multidrug treatment. S/GSK1349572 is an integrase inhibitor discovered by ViiV/Shinongi which was entering phase three in clinical trials in 2011. This new drug is promising and seems to be well tolerated and so far shows better results than both raltegravir and elvitegravir.

Since there have been problems with resistance to raltegravir and elvitegravir, scientists have started to work on new second generation integrase inhibitors, such as MK-2048 which in 2009 was developed by Merck. It's a prototype second generation INSTI that remains potent against viruses containing mutations against raltegravir and elvitegravir. The mechanism of action and SAR of MK-2048 is the same as of the other INSTIs, the structure of MK-2048 shown in figure 6 with essential pharmacophore highlighted.

Even though drugs discussed above are promising the development has a long way to go and many things are still unknown about the efficacy, safety and mechanism of action of these drugs.

== See also ==
- Raltegravir
- Elvitegravir
- Integrase
- Integrase inhibitor
- HIV
- Reverse transcriptase
- MK-2048
- Dolutegravir
- Bictegravir
