= BI 224436 =

Chemical compound

Clinical data
- ATC code: none

Legal status
- Legal status: Investigational

Pharmacokinetic data
- Elimination half-life: 7 hrs (simulated)

Identifiers
- IUPAC name: (2S)-[4-(2,3-Dihydropyrano[4,3,2-de]quinolin-7-yl)-2-methyl-3-quinolinyl][(2-methyl-2-propanyl)oxy]acetic acid
- CAS Number: 1155419-89-8
- PubChem CID: 66561902
- ChemSpider: 32698770
- UNII: 99A996378Y
- CompTox Dashboard (EPA): DTXSID601029847

Chemical and physical data
- Formula: C_{27}H_{26}N_{2}O_{4}
- Molar mass: 442.515 g·mol^{−1}
- 3D model (JSmol): Interactive image
- SMILES: CC1=NC2=CC=CC=C2C(=C1[C@@H](C(=O)O)OC(C)(C)C)C3=C4C5=C(C=C3)OCCC5=CC=N4
- InChI: InChI=1S/C27H26N2O4/c1-15-21(25(26(30)31)33-27(2,3)4)23(17-7-5-6-8-19(17)29-15)18-9-10-20-22-16(12-14-32-20)11-13-28-24(18)22/h5-11,13,25H,12,14H2,1-4H3,(H,30,31)/t25-/m0/s1; Key:MIXIIJCBELCMCZ-VWLOTQADSA-N

BI 224436 was an investigational new drug under development for the treatment of HIV infection. BI 224436 is the first non-catalytic site integrase inhibitor (NCINI). It inhibits HIV replication via binding to a conserved allosteric pocket of the HIV integrase enzyme. This makes the drug distinct in its mechanism of action compared to raltegravir and elvitegravir, which bind at the catalytic site. In October 2011, Gilead Sciences purchased exclusive rights to develop BI 224436 and several related compounds under investigation in Boehringer Ingelheim’s noncatalytic site integrase inhibitor program.

Clinical trials were abandoned in advance of Phase 1.
