= RadC RNA motif =

radC RNA motif
- Consensus secondary structure of radC RNAs

Identifiers
- Symbol: radC RNA
- Rfam: RF01754

Other data
- RNA type: RF01754
- Domain: Bacteria
- PDB structures: PDBe

The radC RNA motif is a conserved RNA structure identified by bioinformatics. The radC RNA motif is found in certain bacteria where it is consistent located in the presumed 5' untranslated regions of genes whose encoded proteins bind DNA are interact with other proteins that bind DNA. These proteins include integrases, methyltransferases that might methylate DNA, proteins that inhibit restriction enzymes and radC genes. Although radC genes were thought to encode DNA repair proteins, this conclusion was based on mutation data that was later shown to affect a different gene. However, it is still possible that radC genes play some DNA-related role. No radC RNAs have been detected in any purified phage whose sequence was available as of 2010, although integrases are often used by phages.
