= Bictegravir =

Chemical compound

Clinical data
- Pronunciation: /bɪkˈtɛɡrəvɪər/ bik-TEG-rə-veer
- Other names: GS-9883
- ATC code: None

Identifiers
- IUPAC name: (1S,11R,13R)-5-Hydroxy-3,6-dioxo-N-(2,4,6-trifluorobenzyl)-12-oxa-2,9-diazatetracyclo[11.2.1.0~2,11~.0~4,9~]hexadeca-4,7-diene-7-carboxamide
- CAS Number: 1611493-60-7; as salt: 1807988-02-8
- PubChem CID: 90311989
- DrugBank: DB11799; as salt: DBSALT002077
- ChemSpider: 44208822; as salt: 48772870
- UNII: 8GB79LOJ07; as salt: 4L5MP1Y7W7
- KEGG: D10909; as salt: D10910
- ChEBI: CHEBI:172943
- ChEMBL: ChEMBL3989866; as salt: ChEMBL3989867
- CompTox Dashboard (EPA): DTXSID701027937

Chemical and physical data
- Formula: C_{21}H_{18}F_{3}N_{3}O_{5}
- Molar mass: 449.386 g·mol^{−1}
- 3D model (JSmol): Interactive image
- SMILES: c1c(cc(c(c1F)CNC(=O)c2cn3c(c(c2=O)O)C(=O)N4[C@H]5CC[C@H](C5)O[C@@H]4C3)F)F
- InChI: InChI=1S/C21H18F3N3O5/c22-9-3-14(23)12(15(24)4-9)6-25-20(30)13-7-26-8-16-27(10-1-2-11(5-10)32-16)21(31)17(26)19(29)18(13)28/h3-4,7,10-11,16,29H,1-2,5-6,8H2,(H,25,30)/t10-,11+,16+/m0/s1; Key:SOLUWJRYJLAZCX-LYOVBCGYSA-N

Bictegravir (INN; BIC) is a second-generation integrase inhibitor (INSTI) class that was structurally derived from an earlier compound dolutegravir by scientists at Gilead Sciences. In vitro and clinical results were presented by Gilead in the summer of 2016. In 2016, bictegravir was in a Phase 3 trial as part of a single tablet regimen in combination with tenofovir alafenamide (TAF) and emtricitabine (FTC) for the treatment of HIV-1 infection.

The combination drug bictegravir/emtricitabine/tenofovir alafenamide (Biktarvy) was approved for use in 2018 in Australia, the European Union and the United States and in 2019 in New Zealand and the United Kingdom; a generic version was approved by the Drugs Controller General of India in 2019. As of 2024, it is recommended as a first-line choice of antiretroviral therapy in several countries, including the European Union, the United Kingdom and the United States. Bictegravir/lenacapavir is another combination drug made using bictegravir. It is in late stage development.

== Medical use ==
Bictegravir is used in a fixed-dose combination with tenofovir alafenamide and emtricitabine for the treatment of HIV-1 infection.

== Contraindication ==
Bictegravir should not be used with dofetilide and rifampin. Use of dofetilide with bictegravir increases the concentration of dofetilide, which can lead to life-threatening events. Concomitant use of bictegravir and rifampin causes significant interactions because of an effect rifampin has on bictegravir. Bictagravir is metabolized primarily through the liver (CYP3A4), so inducers of CYP3A4 should be avoided.

== Adverse effects ==
The most common side effects seen in bictegravir use include diarrhea, nausea, and headache.

== Society and culture ==
=== Economics ===
In February 2022, Gilead agreed to pay ViiV Healthcare over $1 billion to settle patent infringement cases.

== Synthesis ==
A couple of syntheses of bictegravir were recently reported. Below is one of them:

skin-invert-image

The condensation of Meldrum's acid [2033-24-1] (1) with methoxyacetic acid [625-45-6] (2) in the presence of pivaloyl chloride gave rise to [343246-51-5] (3). Treatment of this intermediate with 2,4,6-trifluorobenzylamine [214759-21-4] (4) and TFA gave β-ketoamide, 4-methoxy-3-oxo-N-(2,4,6-trifluorobenzyl)butanamide [1846582-16-8] (5). The reaction with DMF-DMA followed by condensation with 2,2-Dimethoxyethylamine [22483-09-6] (6) yielded vinylogous amide, PC154010209 (7). Next, a cyclization reaction occurred upon treatment with dimethyl oxalate; [553-90-2 ] (8) and sodium methoxide giving rise to pyridone [1644158-10-0] (9) Acetal deprotection was followed by treatment with syn-aminopentanol, (1R,3S)-3-Aminocyclopentanol [1110772-05-8][124555-42-6] (10) under weakly basic conditions. This is an annulation reaction arriving at [1616340-94-3] (11). Magnesium bromide mediated demethylation completed the synthesis of bictegravir (12).
