= Bictegravir/lenacapavir =

Medication

Combination of
- Bictegravir: Integrase inhibitor
- Lenacapavir: Capsid inhibitor

Clinical data
- Trade names: Bixlenvo
- AHFS/Drugs.com: Bixlenvo
- License data: US DailyMed: Bictegravir and lenacapavir
- Routes of administration: By mouth
- ATC code: None

Legal status
- Legal status: US: ℞-only

Bictegravir/lenacapavir, sold under the brand name Bixlenvo, is a fixed-dose combination antiretroviral medication used for the treatment of HIV/AIDS. It contains bictegravir, a human immunodeficiency virus type 1 (HIV-1) integrase strand transfer inhibitor; and lenacapavir, an HIV-1 capsid inhibitor. It is taken by mouth. It was developed by Gilead Sciences.

Bictegravir/lenacapavir was approved for medical use in the United States in August 2026.

== Medical uses ==
Bictegravir/lenacapavir is indicated as a complete regimen for the treatment of HIV-1 in adults to replace the current antiretroviral regimen in those who are virologically suppressed (HIV-1 RNA less than 50 copies per mL) on a stable antiretroviral regimen with no known or suspected resistance to bictegravir or lenacapavir.

== Society and culture ==
=== Legal status ===
Bictegravir/lenacapavir was approved for medical use in the United States in August 2026.

=== Names ===
Bictegravir/lenacapavir is sold under the brand name Bixlenvo.
