= Bictegravir/emtricitabine/tenofovir alafenamide =

Fixed dose combination HIV drug

Combination of
- Bictegravir: integrase inhibitor
- Emtricitabine: nucleoside reverse transcriptase inhibitor
- Tenofovir alafenamide: nucleotide reverse transcriptase inhibitor

Clinical data
- Trade names: Biktarvy, Taffic
- AHFS/Drugs.com: Monograph
- MedlinePlus: a618012
- License data: US DailyMed: Biktarvy
- Pregnancy category: AU: B3
- Routes of administration: By mouth
- ATC code: J05AR20 (WHO)

Legal status
- Legal status: AU: S4 (Prescription only); CA: ℞-only; UK: POM (Prescription only); US: ℞-only; EU: Rx-only; In general: ℞ (Prescription only)

Identifiers
- CAS Number: 2097023-87-3
- KEGG: D11039

Bictegravir/emtricitabine/tenofovir alafenamide (BIC/FTC/TAF or B/F/TAF), sold under the brand name Biktarvy, is a fixed-dose combination antiretroviral medication for the treatment of HIV/AIDS and as post-exposure prophylaxis (PEP) to prevent HIV infection following potential exposure. It contains bictegravir, a human immunodeficiency virus type 1 (HIV-1) integrase strand transfer inhibitor; emtricitabine, an HIV-1 nucleoside analog reverse transcriptase inhibitor; and tenofovir alafenamide, an HIV-1 nucleotide analog reverse transcriptase inhibitor.

It was approved for use in 2018 in Australia, the European Union and the United States and in 2019 in New Zealand and the United Kingdom; a generic version was approved by the Drugs Controller General of India in 2019. As of 2024, it is recommended as a first-line choice of antiretroviral therapy in several countries, including the European Union, the United Kingdom and the United States.

== Medical uses ==
The combination is indicated for the treatment of human immunodeficiency virus 1 (HIV 1) infection in people weighing at least 14 kilograms (31 lb) without present or past evidence of viral resistance to the integrase inhibitor class, emtricitabine or tenofovir.

Bictegravir/emtricitabine/tenofovir alafenamide has been evaluated as a post‐exposure prophylaxis (PEP) regimen to prevent HIV infection following nonoccupational exposure. In May 2025, the US Centers for Disease Control and Prevention (CDC) issued updated guidelines recommending the drug as a preferred regimen for nonoccupational post-exposure prophylaxis in adults and adolescents without contraindications.

== Side effects ==
The US FDA prescription label contains a boxed warning about acute exacerbations of hepatitis B.

Adverse drug reactions include, but are not limited to, diarrhea, nausea, and headache.

== Combination therapy ==
Bictegravir/emtricitabine/tenofovir alafenamide is an example of a combination drug that can be taken as a complete regimen for the treatment of the human immunodeficiency virus.

Combination therapy for HIV, often called highly active antiretroviral therapy (HAART), is composed of two or more types of antiretroviral drugs. Combination therapy decreases the likelihood that drug resistance will occur, because it is unlikely that the HIV-1 strains will be able to mutate enough to become resistant to all drugs being used in the combination. Combination therapy increases the length of lives of patients with HIV-1, and can greatly reduce the possibility for transmission of the virus within 1 to 6 months to undetectable =/= untransmissable levels.

== Components ==
Bictegravir (BIC) is an integrase strand transfer inhibitor (INSTI). Bictegravir is different from other INSTIs because it contains a bridged bicyclic ring and a distinct benzyl tail with a 2,4,6-trifluorobenzyl group. This contributes to an increase in plasma protein binding and a reduction of activation of the pregnane X receptor (PXR). These changes minimize interactions between drugs, lower clearance, and increase solubility. Bictegravir was found to be less drug resistant than other drugs in the same class.

Emtricitabine (FTC) is a nucleoside reverse transcriptase inhibitor (NRTI) that is a synthetic fluoro derivative of thiacytidine. Within the cell, emtricitabine becomes phosphorylated, which forms emtricitabine 5′-triphosphate within the cell. This allows for the drug to compete with the viral and host substrate and ultimately causes a termination of DNA chain elongation. Underlying hepatitis B virus (HBV) can interact with emtricitabine to cause significant liver damage, but it does not have a significant detrimental effect on the liver when given to patients without HBV.

Tenofovir alafenamide (TAF) is a prodrug of tenofovir that functions as a nucleotide reverse transcriptase inhibitor (NtRTI). Other prodrugs for tenofovir have been tested, but TAF is more efficient at refining HIV-1 therapy. It converts intracellularly to TFV diphosphate, which is a metabolite in HIV target cells. Thus, TAF has higher active metabolite concentrations and lower plasma TFV than other Tenofovir prodrugs. TAF is metabolized primarily with the kidneys, and has a lower dosage than other prodrugs, so it is less detrimental to the renal elimination system.

== Economics ==
In 2023, the Institute for Clinical and Economic Review (ICER) identified Biktarvy (bictegravir/emtricitabine/tenofovir alafenamide), developed by Gilead Sciences, as one of five high-expenditure drugs that experienced significant net price increases without new clinical evidence to justify the hikes. Specifically, Biktarvy's wholesale acquisition cost rose by 5.49%, leading to an additional $815 million in costs to U.S. payers.
