= Lepetegravir =

Investigational drug

Clinical data
- Other names: GS-1720

Identifiers
- IUPAC name: (10S,13R)-6-hydroxy-10,13-dimethyl-5,8-dioxo-N-[(2,4,6-trifluorophenyl)methyl]-1,2,9-triazatricyclo[7.4.1.02,7]tetradeca-3,6,11-triene-4-carboxamide
- CAS Number: 2808219-64-7
- PubChem CID: 164590400
- ChemSpider: 129698520
- UNII: U7N3Q737CA
- ChEMBL: ChEMBL5883239

Chemical and physical data
- Formula: C21H19F3N4O4
- Molar mass: 448.402 g·mol^{−1}
- 3D model (JSmol): Interactive image
- SMILES: C[C@H]1C=C[C@H](N2CN1C(=O)C3=C(C(=O)C(=CN32)C(=O)NCC4=C(C=C(C=C4F)F)F)O)C
- InChI: InChI=InChI=1S/C21H19F3N4O4/c1-10-3-4-11(2)28-9-26(10)21(32)17-19(30)18(29)14(8-27(17)28)20(31)25-7-13-15(23)5-12(22)6-16(13)24/h3-6,8,10-11,30H,7,9H2,1-2H3,(H,25,31)/t10-,11+/m0/s1; Key:AFHGIULBHAXDDI-WDEREUQCSA-N

Lepetegravir is an investigational new drug that is being developed by Gilead Sciences for the treatment of HIV-1 infection. It is a HIV integrase inhibitor.
