= Atazanavir/cobicistat =

Combination drug for HIV

Combination of
- Atazanavir: HIV protease inhibitor
- Cobicistat: Cytochrome P450 (CYP3A) inhibitor

Clinical data
- Trade names: Evotaz
- AHFS/Drugs.com: Professional Drug Facts
- License data: US DailyMed: Atazanavir_and_cobicistat
- ATC code: J05AR15 (WHO)

Legal status
- Legal status: UK: POM (Prescription only); US: ℞-only; EU: Rx-only

Identifiers
- CAS Number: 2446322-19-4
- KEGG: D10753

Atazanavir/cobicistat (ATV/c), sold under the brand name Evotaz, is a fixed-dose combination antiretroviral medication used to treat and prevent HIV/AIDS. It contains atazanavir and cobicistat. Atazanavir is an HIV protease inhibitor and cobicistat is an inhibitor of cytochrome P450 (CYP) enzymes of the CYP3A family.

Atazanavir/cobicistat was approved by the Food and Drug Administration (FDA) for medical use in United States in January 2015. It was authorized for medical use in the European Union in July 2015.

== Medical uses ==
Atazanavir/cobicistat is indicated for use in combination with other antiretroviral agents for the treatment of HIV‑1 infection in people weighing at least 35 kilograms (77 lb).
