= Darunavir/cobicistat =

Pharmaceutical drug

Combination of
- Darunavir: HIV protease inhibitor
- Cobicistat: Cytochrome P450 (CYP3A) inhibitor

Clinical data
- Trade names: Rezolsta, Prezcobix
- AHFS/Drugs.com: Professional Drug Facts
- License data: US DailyMed: Prezcobix
- Pregnancy category: AU: B2
- Routes of administration: By mouth
- ATC code: J05AR14 (WHO)

Legal status
- Legal status: AU: S4 (Prescription only); CA: ℞-only; US: ℞-only; EU: Rx-only

Identifiers
- CAS Number: 206361-99-1; 1004316-88-4
- PubChem CID: 57327017
- UNII: YO603Y8113; LW2E03M5PG
- KEGG: D10832

Chemical and physical data
- Formula: C_{67}H_{90}N_{10}O_{12}S_{3}
- Molar mass: 1323.70 g·mol^{−1}
- 3D model (JSmol): Interactive image
- SMILES: CC(C)CN(CC(C(CC1=CC=CC=C1)NC(=O)OC2COC3C2CCO3)O)S(=O)(=O)C4=CC=C(C=C4)N.CC(C)C1=NC(=CS1)CN(C)C(=O)NC(CCN2CCOCC2)C(=O)NC(CCC(CC3=CC=CC=C3)NC(=O)OCC4=CN=CS4)CC5=CC=CC=C5
- InChI: InChI=1S/C40H53N7O5S2.C27H37N3O7S/c1-29(2)38-43-34(27-53-38)25-46(3)39(49)45-36(16-17-47-18-20-51-21-19-47)37(48)42-32(22-30-10-6-4-7-11-30)14-15-33(23-31-12-8-5-9-13-31)44-40(50)52-26-35-24-41-28-54-35;1-18(2)15-30(38(33,34)21-10-8-20(28)9-11-21)16-24(31)23(14-19-6-4-3-5-7-19)29-27(32)37-25-17-36-26-22(25)12-13-35-26/h4-13,24,27-29,32-33,36H,14-23,25-26H2,1-3H3,(H,42,48)(H,44,50)(H,45,49);3-11,18,22-26,31H,12-17,28H2,1-2H3,(H,29,32)/t32-,33-,36+;22-,23-,24+,25-,26+/m10/s1; Key:CXORHDVSJFELCV-HWDLLDTBSA-N

Darunavir/cobicistat (DRV/c), sold under the brand names Prezcobix (US) and Rezolsta (EU), is a fixed-dose combination antiretroviral medication used to treat and prevent HIV/AIDS. It contains darunavir and cobicistat. Darunavir is an HIV protease inhibitor and cobicistat increases the effectiveness of darunavir by blocking its metabolism by the enzyme CYP3A.

Darunavir/cobicistat was approved for use in the European Union in November 2014, and for use in the United States in January 2015.
