= Barrier to autointegration factor 1 =

Protein-coding gene in the species Homo sapiens

BANF1
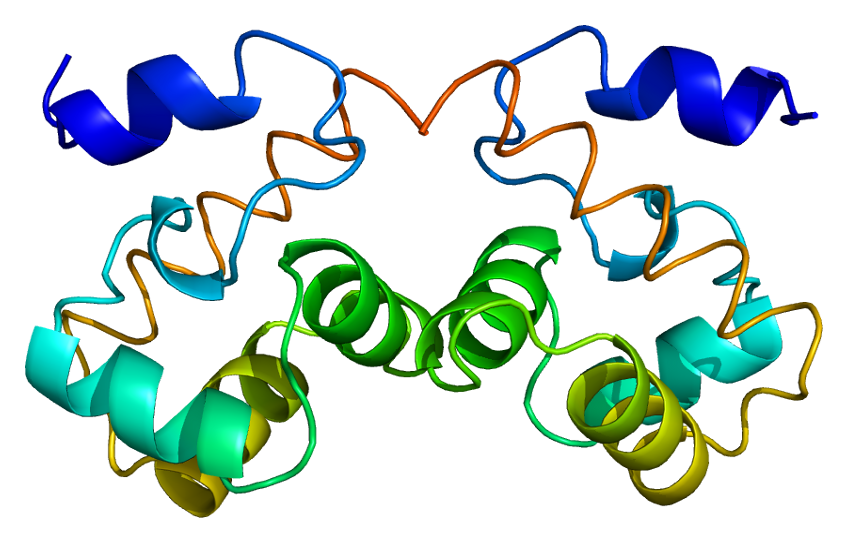

Identifiers
- Aliases: BANF1, BAF, BCRP1, D14S1460, NGPS, Barrier to autointegration factor 1, BAF nuclear assembly factor 1
- External IDs: OMIM: 603811; MGI: 1346330; GeneCards: BANF1
Available structures
PDB	Ortholog search: PDBe RCSB
PDB	List of PDB id codes 1QCK, 2ODG, 1CI4, 2BZF, 2EZY, 2EZZ, 2EZX

Gene location (Human)
Chr.	Chromosome 11 (human)
Band	11q13.1	Start	66,002,228 bp
Band	11q13.1	End	66,004,149 bp

Gene location (Mouse)
Chr.	Chromosome 19 (mouse)
Band	19|19 A	Start	5,414,666 bp
Band	19|19 A	End	5,417,196 bp
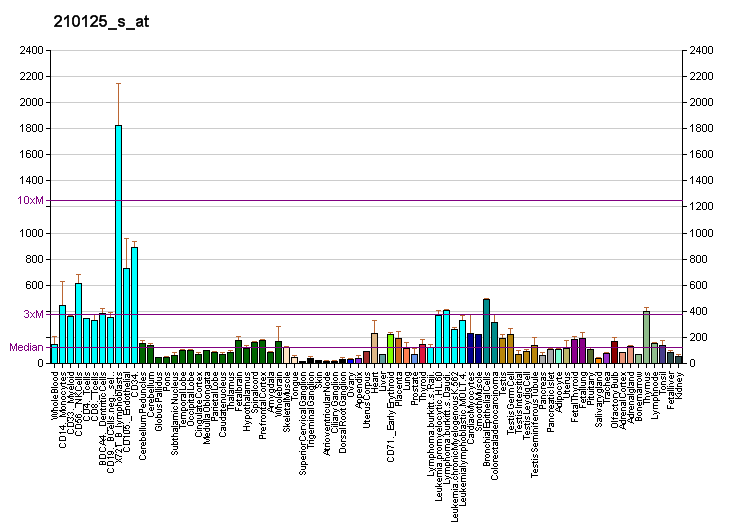
RNA expression pattern
Bgee	Human / Mouse (ortholog); Top expressed in: ganglionic eminence; ventricular zone; right uterine tube; muscle of thigh; apex of heart; gastrocnemius muscle; ascending aorta; body of uterus; Descending thoracic aorta; right coronary artery / Top expressed in: somite; embryo; medial ganglionic eminence; mandibular prominence; maxillary prominence; epiblast; embryo; thymus; fetal liver hematopoietic progenitor cell; hand; More reference expression data
BioGPS	More reference expression data
Gene ontology
Molecular function	DNA binding; protein binding; protein C-terminus binding; enzyme binding; protein homodimerization activity; protein N-terminus binding; LEM domain binding; identical protein binding
Cellular component	cytoplasm; extracellular exosome; condensed chromosome; nucleus; chromosome; nucleoplasm; cytosol; nuclear envelope
Biological process	mitotic nuclear membrane reassembly; response to virus; mitotic nuclear membrane disassembly; DNA integration; establishment of integrated proviral latency; viral process; nuclear transport; negative regulation of viral genome replication; chromosome segregation; chromosome condensation
Sources:Amigo / QuickGO
Orthologs
Databases	NCBI: entry; OMA: entry
Species	Human	Mouse
Entrez	8815	23825
Ensembl	ENSG00000175334	ENSMUSG00000024844
UniProt	O75531	O54962
RefSeq (mRNA)	NM_003860; NM_001143985	NM_001038231; NM_001286608; NM_011793
RefSeq (protein)	NP_001137457; NP_003851	NP_001033320; NP_001273537; NP_035923
Location (UCSC)	Chr 11: 66 – 66 Mb	Chr 19: 5.41 – 5.42 Mb
PubMed search
- Wikidata
View/Edit Human	View/Edit Mouse

Barrier-to-autointegration factor is a protein that in humans is encoded by the BANF1 gene. It is a member of the barrier-to-autointegration factor family of proteins.

== Function ==
The protein encoded by this gene was identified by its ability to protect retroviruses from intramolecular integration and therefore promote intermolecular integration into the host cell genome. The endogenous function of the protein is unknown. The protein forms a homodimer which localizes to the nucleus and is specifically associated with chromosomes during mitosis. This protein binds to DNA in a non-specific manner and studies in rodents suggest that it also binds to lamina-associated polypeptide 2, a component of the nuclear lamina. It also associates with the LEM Domain containing proteins LAP2, Emerin, and MAN1. The protein's DNA binding ability is modulated by ATP concentration.

== Interactions ==
Barrier to autointegration factor 1 has been shown to interact with Thymopoietin.

== Clinical relevance ==
Mutations in this gene have been shown to cause hereditary progeroid syndrome.

== See also ==
- Retroviral integration
