= Elvitegravir/cobicistat/emtricitabine/tenofovir =

Combination drug for HIV

Combination of
- Elvitegravir: Integrase inhibitor
- Cobicistat: Cytochrome P450 inhibitor
- Emtricitabine: Reverse-transcriptase inhibitor
- Tenofovir disoproxil: Reverse-transcriptase inhibitor

Clinical data
- Trade names: Stribild
- AHFS/Drugs.com: Professional Drug Facts
- Pregnancy category: AU: B3
- Routes of administration: By mouth
- ATC code: J05AR09 (WHO)

Legal status
- Legal status: AU: S4 (Prescription only); UK: POM (Prescription only); US: ℞-only; EU: Rx-only

Identifiers
- CAS Number: 1430117-57-9
- ChemSpider: none
- KEGG: D10756

Elvitegravir/cobicistat/emtricitabine/tenofovir, sold under the brand name Stribild (STRY-bild), also known as the Quad pill, is a fixed-dose combination antiretroviral medication for the treatment of HIV/AIDS. Elvitegravir, emtricitabine and tenofovir disoproxil directly suppress viral reproduction. Cobicistat increases the effectiveness of the combination by inhibiting the liver and gut wall enzymes that metabolize elvitegravir. It is taken by mouth. It is manufactured by Gilead Sciences.

Serum creatinine (a marker of kidney function) may increase with use of elvitegravir/cobicistat/emtricitabine/tenofovir. This is caused by cobicistat's inhibition of tubular secretion in the nephron.

== Society and culture ==
=== Legal status ===
Elvitegravir/cobicistat/emtricitabine/tenofovir gained approval by the U.S. Food and Drug Administration (FDA) in August 2012, for use in adults starting antiretroviral treatment for the first time as part of the fixed dose combination.

=== Economics ===
Gilead's stated wholesale price of Stribild is US$28,500 per patient, per year. Gilead maintains that its pricing is comparable to other HIV medications on the market. Elvitegravir/cobicistat/emtricitabine/tenofovir (Stribild) is priced at 39 percent higher than emtricitabine/rilpivirine/tenofovir (Complera), a three-drug HIV regimen approved a year earlier. At the time of Complera's approval, there were concerns about the US$20,500 wholesale cost of efavirenz/emtricitabine/tenofovir (Atripla), which is marketed by Gilead and Bristol-Myers Squibb. HIV drug prices have increased substantially. Atripla, a combination therapy released in 2006, was priced at US$13,800 per person, per year. Atripla's wholesale prices have risen to the level of Complera's at US$20,500.
