= MK-2048 =

Investigational drug for the prevention and treatment of HIV

- MK-2048

Clinical data
- ATC code: none

Legal status
- Legal status: US: Investigational New Drug

Identifiers
- IUPAC name: (6S)-2-[(3-chloro-4-fluorophenyl)methyl]-8-ethyl-9-hydroxy-N,6-dimethyl-1,10-dioxo-6,7-dihydropyrazino[3,4]pyrrolo[3,4-b]pyridazine-4-carboxamide
- CAS Number: 869901-69-9
- PubChem CID: 11554427
- ChemSpider: 25058456
- UNII: LJ8U884TM5
- ChEMBL: ChEMBL1237018
- CompTox Dashboard (EPA): DTXSID70236031
- ECHA InfoCard: 100.233.568

Chemical and physical data
- Formula: C_{21}H_{21}ClFN_{5}O_{4}
- Molar mass: 461.88 g·mol^{−1}
- 3D model (JSmol): Interactive image
- SMILES: CCN1CC(N2C3=C(C(=O)C2=C1O)C(=O)N(N=C3C(=O)NC)CC4=CC(=C(C=C4)F)Cl)C
- InChI: InChI=1S/C21H21ClFN5O4/c1-4-26-8-10(2)28-16-14(18(29)17(28)21(26)32)20(31)27(25-15(16)19(30)24-3)9-11-5-6-13(23)12(22)7-11/h5-7,10,32H,4,8-9H2,1-3H3,(H,24,30)/t10-/m0/s1; Key:IOYLKNABOQYKKY-JTQLQIEISA-N

MK-2048 is a drug that was investigated for the prevention of HIV infection. The drug failed to show a difference in treatment and control arms in Phase I trials. No further studies are planned.

== Design and pre-clinical trials ==
MK-2048 is an integrase inhibitor designed to prevent the integration of the HIV virus into the genome of the host cells. MK-2048 is considered a "second generation integrase". The drug was designed to increase the putative half-life of the drug in the system and therefore increase its potential efficacy as well as avoid resistance to the first line integrase inhibitors. In pre-clinical tests, MK-2048 was as effective against the HIV integrase mutant N155H as against wild-type virus. This class of drugs were designed to be delivered by Vaginal ring to be inserted before sexual intercourse. As such, MK-2048 was investigated for use as part of a pre-exposure prophylaxis (PrEP) approach to the treatment of HIV infection.

== Clinical trials ==
The first clinical trial was completed in 2016 and tested the safety and pharmacokinetics of MK-2048 and Vicriviroc (VCV or MK-4176) as delivered by vaginal rings (VR). The single-blind, randomized, placebo-controlled trial was conducted in 48 women, evaluated VRs containing MK-2048 (30 mg) and vicriviroc (VCV, 182 mg), alone or in combination, and placebo. The ring was used continuously for 28 days. The VR with drug reported no more adverse effects than the placebo. There was also no difference in HIV infection acquisition in the control and treatment arms despite high levels of drug in the tissues.
