= PSIP1 =

Protein found in humans

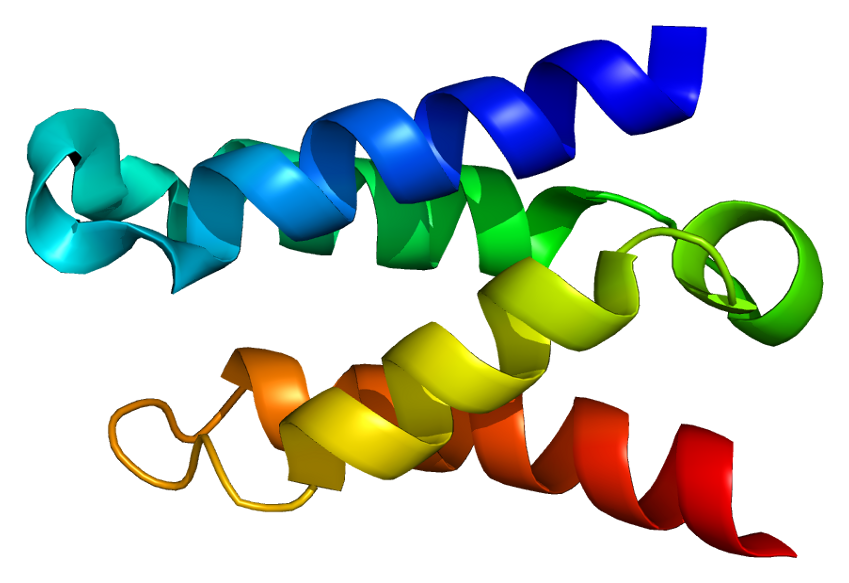

Identifiers
- Aliases: PSIP1, DFS70, LEDGF, PAIP, PSIP2, p52, p75, PC4 and SFRS1 interacting protein 1
- External IDs: OMIM: 603620; MGI: 2142116; GeneCards: PSIP1
Available structures
PDB	Ortholog search: PDBe RCSB
PDB	List of PDB id codes 1Z9E, 2B4J, 2M16, 2MSR, 2MTN, 2N3A, 3F9K, 3HPG, 3HPH, 3U88, 3ZEH, 4FU6

Gene location (Human)
Chr.	Chromosome 9 (human)
Band	9p22.3	Start	15,464,066 bp
Band	9p22.3	End	15,510,995 bp

Gene location (Mouse)
Chr.	Chromosome 4 (mouse)
Band	4|4 C3	Start	83,373,917 bp
Band	4|4 C3	End	83,404,696 bp
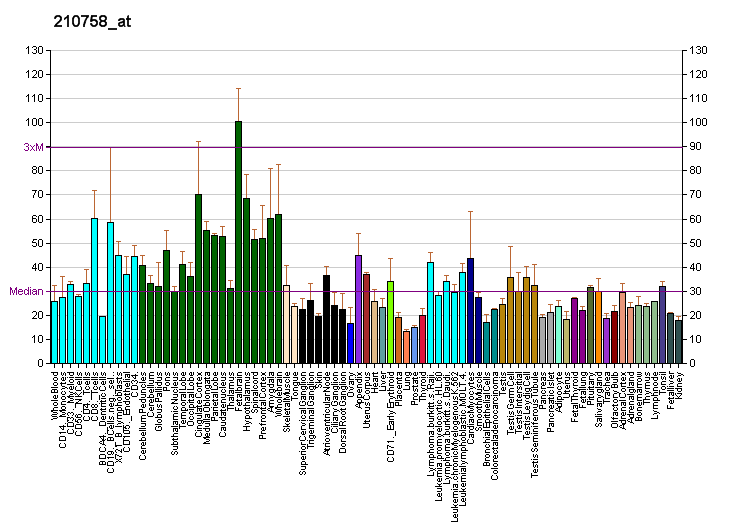

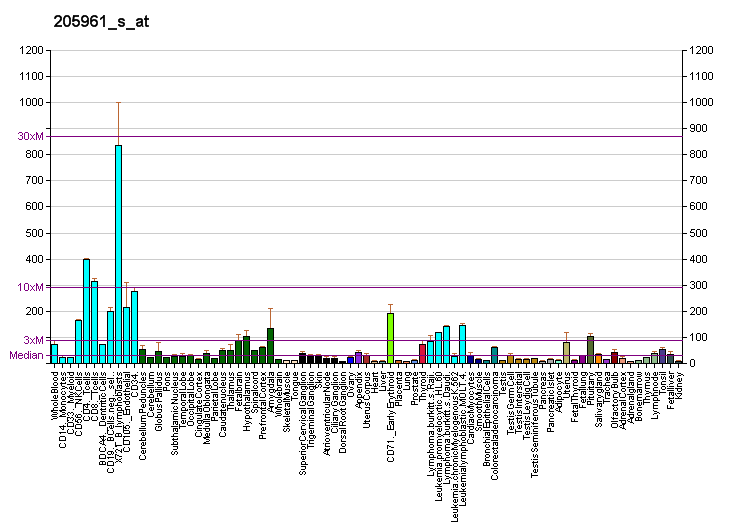

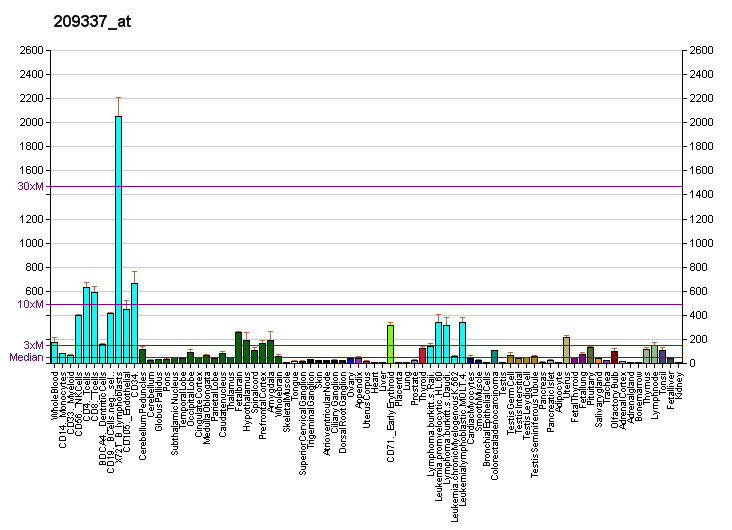
RNA expression pattern
Bgee	Human / Mouse (ortholog); Top expressed in: secondary oocyte; ventricular zone; ganglionic eminence; cerebellar hemisphere; right hemisphere of cerebellum; Brodmann area 9; Achilles tendon; optic nerve; C1 segment; nucleus accumbens / Top expressed in: tail of embryo; ventricular zone; genital tubercle; spermatocyte; zygote; ganglionic eminence; secondary oocyte; lateral septal nucleus; abdominal wall; epiblast; More reference expression data
BioGPS	More reference expression data
Gene ontology
Molecular function	DNA binding; transcription coactivator activity; chromatin binding; protein binding; supercoiled DNA binding; RNA binding
Cellular component	cytosol; nuclear periphery; nucleoplasm; nucleolus; nucleus
Biological process	regulation of transcription, DNA-templated; response to heat; response to oxidative stress; transcription, DNA-templated; establishment of integrated proviral latency; mRNA 5'-splice site recognition; positive regulation of transcription by RNA polymerase II; viral process; nuclear transport
Sources:Amigo / QuickGO
Orthologs
Databases	NCBI: entry; OMA: entry
Species	Human	Mouse
Entrez	11168	101739
Ensembl	ENSG00000164985	ENSMUSG00000028484
UniProt	O75475	Q99JF8
RefSeq (mRNA)	NM_001128217; NM_021144; NM_033222; NM_001317898; NM_001317900	NM_001290527; NM_133948; NM_001347143; NM_001355203
RefSeq (protein)	NP_001121689; NP_001304827; NP_001304829; NP_066967; NP_150091	NP_001277456; NP_001334072; NP_598709; NP_001342132
Location (UCSC)	Chr 9: 15.46 – 15.51 Mb	Chr 4: 83.37 – 83.4 Mb
PubMed search
- Wikidata
View/Edit Human	View/Edit Mouse

PC4 and SFRS1 interacting protein 1, also known as lens epithelium-derived growth factor (LEDGF/p75), dense fine speckles 70kD protein (DFS 70) or transcriptional coactivator p75/p52, is a protein that in humans is encoded by the PSIP1 gene.

== Function ==
PSIP1 has not been clearly linked to a specific cellular mechanism. The term LEDGF/p75 (Lens epithelium-derived growth factor) has entered common usage based on the initial characterization of PSIP1, however this is a misnomer, as the protein is present in most tissues and has no direct role in the development of lens epithelium. LEDGF/p75, a transcription coactivator, gained prominence as a host factor that assists HIV integration and is probably the only integrase interactor whose knock-down severely affects the HIV integration levels. The interaction between HIV integrase and human LEDGF/p75 is a promising target for anti-HIV drug discovery. LEDGF/p75 recruits MLL complexes to HOX genes to regulate their expression. LEDGF/p52 is shown to recruit splicing factors to H3K36 trimethylated chromatin to modulate alternative splicing, also regulates HOTTIP lncRNA, which is shown to regulate HOX genes in cis.

== Structure ==
LEDGF/p75 is a 60kDa, 530-amino-acid-long protein. The N-terminal portion of the protein consists of a PWWP domain, a nuclear localization sequence, and two copies of the AT-hook DNA binding motif. The C-terminal portion of LEDGF/p75 contains a structure termed the integrase-binding domain, which interacts with lentiviral integrase proteins as well as numerous cellular proteins. The N-terminal portion interacts strongly with chromatin, making LEDGF/p75 a constitutively nuclear protein. An isoform of the protein, LEDGF/p52, is produced by alternative splicing. LEDGF/p52 shares the N-terminal 325 amino acids of LEDGF/p75 but lacks the integrase-binding domain.

== Interactions ==
PSIP1 has been shown to interact with the proteins ASF/SF2, JPO2, Cdc7-Dbf4, and POGZ as well as the menin/MLL protein complex.
