= Integrase =

Class of enzymes

Integrase Zinc binding domain
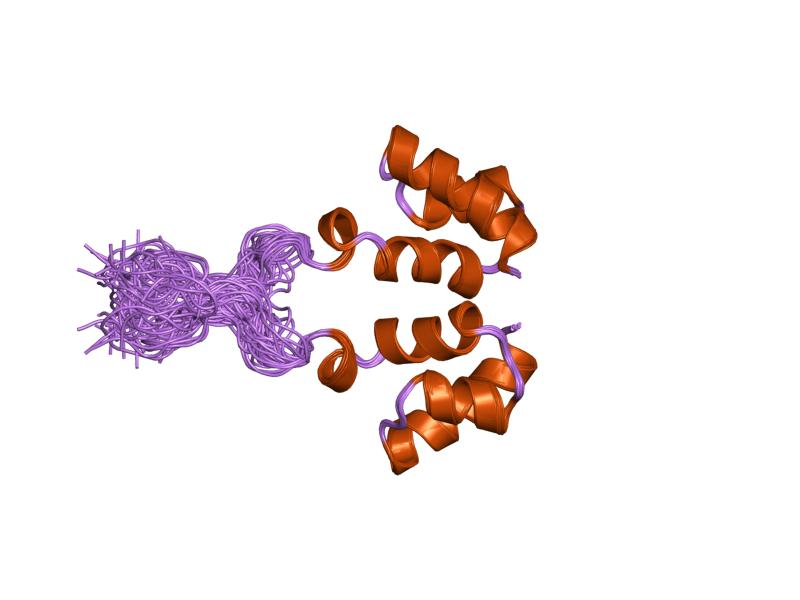
- solution structure of the N-terminal Zn binding domain of HIV-1 integrase (e form), NMR, 38 structures

Identifiers
- Symbol: Integrase_Zn
- Pfam: PF02022
- InterPro: IPR003308
- SCOP2: 1wjb / SCOPe / SUPFAM
Available protein structures:
- PDB: IPR003308 PF02022 (ECOD; PDBsum)
- AlphaFold: IPR003308; PF02022

Integrase core domain
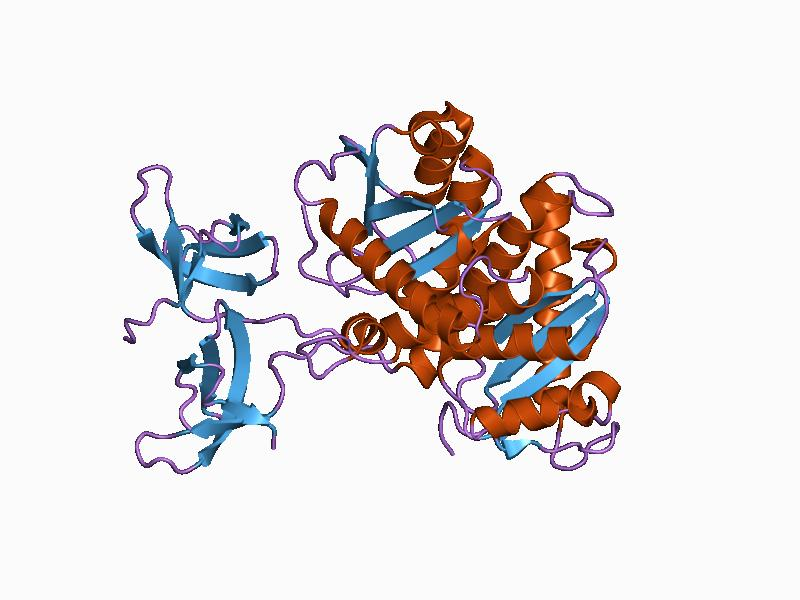
- Crystal structure of the RSV two-domain integrase.

Identifiers
- Symbol: rve
- Pfam: PF00665
- Pfam clan: CL0219
- InterPro: IPR001584
- SCOP2: 2itg / SCOPe / SUPFAM
Available protein structures:
- PDB: IPR001584 PF00665 (ECOD; PDBsum)
- AlphaFold: IPR001584; PF00665

Integrase DNA binding domain
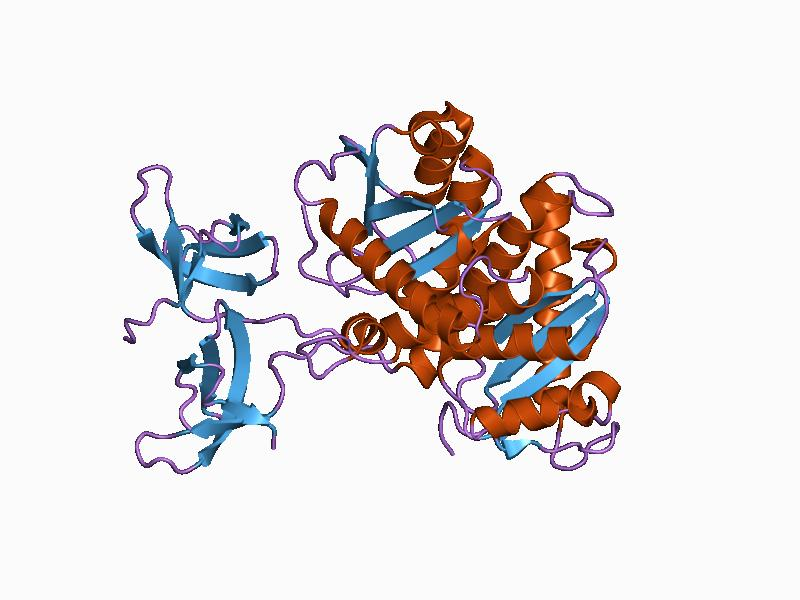
- Crystal structure of the RSV two-domain integrase.

Identifiers
- Symbol: IN_DBD_C
- Pfam: PF00552
- InterPro: IPR001037
- SCOP2: 1ihw / SCOPe / SUPFAM
Available protein structures:
- PDB: IPR001037 PF00552 (ECOD; PDBsum)
- AlphaFold: IPR001037; PF00552

Retroviral integrase (IN) is an enzyme produced by a retrovirus (such as HIV) that integrates (forms covalent links between) its genetic information into that of the host cell it infects. Retroviral INs are not to be confused with phage integrases (recombinases) used in biotechnology, such as λ phage integrase, as discussed in site-specific recombination.

The macromolecular complex of an IN macromolecule bound to the ends of the viral DNA ends has been referred to as the intasome; IN is a key component in this and the retroviral pre-integration complex.

== Structure ==
All retroviral IN proteins contain three canonical domains, connected by flexible linkers:

- an N-terminal HH-CC zinc-binding domain (a three-helical bundle stabilized by coordination of a Zn(II) cation),
- a catalytic core domain (RNaseH fold),
- a C-terminal DNA-binding domain (SH3 fold).

Crystal and NMR structures of the individual domains and 2-domain constructs of integrases from HIV-1, HIV-2, SIV, and Rous Sarcoma Virus (RSV) have been reported, with the first structures determined in 1994. Biochemical data and structural data suggest that retroviral IN functions as a tetramer (dimer-of-dimers), with all three domains being important for multimerization and viral DNA binding. In addition, several host cellular proteins have been shown to interact with IN to facilitate the integration process: e.g., the host factor, human chromatin-associated protein LEDGF, tightly binds HIV IN and directs the HIV pre-integration complex towards highly expressed genes for integration.

Human foamy virus (HFV), an agent harmless to humans, has an integrase similar to HIV IN and is therefore a model of HIV IN function; a 2010 crystal structure of the HFV integrase assembled on viral DNA ends has been determined.

== Function and mechanism ==
Integration occurs following production of the double-stranded linear viral DNA by the viral RNA/DNA-dependent DNA polymerase reverse transcriptase.

The main function of IN is to insert the viral DNA into the host chromosomal DNA, an essential step for HIV replication. Integration is a "point of no return" for the cell, which becomes a permanent carrier of the viral genome (provirus). Integration is in part responsible for the persistence of retroviral infections. After integration, the viral gene expression and particle production may take place immediately or at some point in the future, the timing depends on the activity of the chromosomal locus hosting the provirus.

Retroviral INs catalyze two reactions:

- 3'-processing, in which two or three nucleotides are removed from one or both 3' ends of the viral DNA to expose an invariant CA dinucleotide.
- the strand transfer reaction, in which the processed 3' ends of the viral DNA are covalently ligated to host chromosomal DNA.

Both reactions are catalyzed in the same active site, and involve transesterification without involving a covalent protein-DNA intermediate (in contrast to Ser/Tyr recombinase-catalyzed reactions).

== In HIV ==
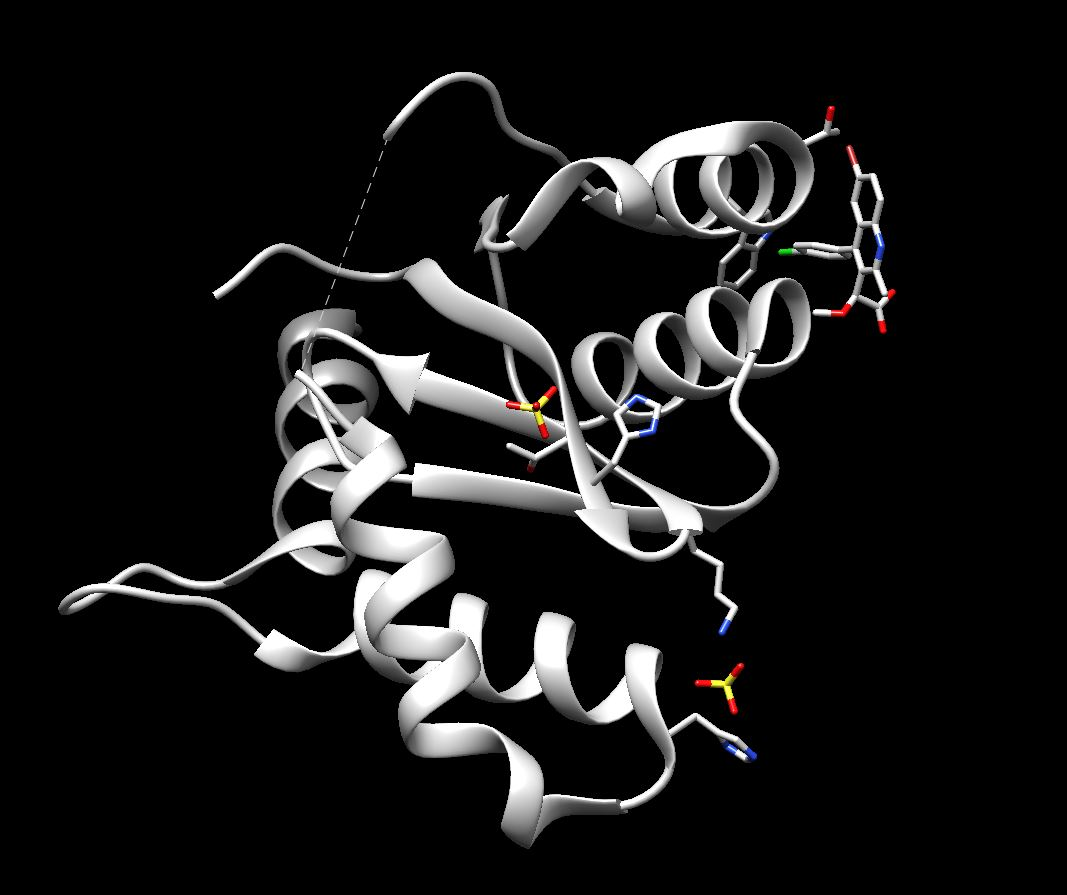
Structural depiction of the HIV catalytic core domain based on the works of Feng, L. and Kvaratskhelia, M. from the protein database

HIV integrase is a 32kDa viral protein consisting of three domains- N-terminus, catalytic core domain, and C-terminus, which each have distinct properties and functions contributing to the efficacy of HIV integrase.

The N-terminus is composed of 50 amino acid residues which contain a conserved histidine, histidine, cytosine, cytosine sequence which chelates zinc ions, furthermore enhancing the enzymatic activity of the catalytic core domain. As metal chelation is vital in integrase efficacy, it is a target for the development of retroviral therapies.

The catalytic core domain, like the N-terminus, contains highly conserved amino acid residues -Asp64, Asp116, Glu152- as the conserved DDE (Asp-Asp-Glu) motif contributes to the endonuclease and polynucleotide transferase functions of integrase. Mutations in these regions inactivates integrase and prevents genome integration.

The C-terminus domain binds to host DNA non-specifically and stabilizes the integration complex.

=== Integration mechanism ===
Following synthesis of HIV's doubled stranded DNA genome, integrase binds to the long tandem repeats flanking the genome on both ends. Using its endonucleolytic activity, integrase cleaves a di or trinucleotide from both 3' ends of the genome in a processing known as 3'-processing. The specificity of cleavage is improved through the use of cofactors such as Mn^{2+} and Mg^{2+} which interact with the DDE motif of the catalytic core domain, acting as cofactors to integrase function.

The newly generated 3'OH groups disrupt the host DNA's phosphodiester linkages through SN2-type nucleophilic attack. The 3' ends are covalently linked to the target DNA. The 5' over hangs of the viral genome are then cleaved using host repair enzymes, those same enzymes are believed to be responsible for the integration of the 5' end into the host genome forming the provirus.

=== Antiretroviral therapy ===
In November 2005, data from a phase 2 study of an investigational HIV integrase inhibitor, MK-0518, demonstrated that the compound has potent antiviral activity. On October 12, 2007, the Food and Drug Administration (U.S.) approved the integrase inhibitor Raltegravir (MK-0518, brand name Isentress). The second integrase inhibitor, elvitegravir, was approved in the U.S. in August 2012.

== See also ==
- Integrase inhibitor
- Integron
