= Integrase inhibitor =

Compounds which inhibit or antagonize biosynthesis or actions of integrase

Integrase inhibitors (INIs) are a class of antiretroviral drug designed to block the action of integrase, a viral enzyme that inserts the viral genome into the DNA of the host cell. Since integration is a vital step in retroviral replication, blocking it can halt further spread of the virus. Integrase inhibitors were initially developed for the treatment of HIV infection, but have been applied to other retroviruses. The class of integrase inhibitors called integrase strand transfer inhibitors (INSTIs) are in established medical use. Other classes, such as allosteric integrase inhibitors (ALLINIs) or integrase binding inhibitors (INBIs), are still experimental.

The development of integrase inhibitors led to a first approval for the class by the U.S. Food and Drug Administration (FDA) on October 12, 2007, for raltegravir (brand name Isentress). Research published at the time supported the conclusion that "[for people living with HIV,] raltegravir plus optimized background therapy provided better viral suppression than optimized background therapy alone for at least 48 weeks."

Since integrase inhibitors target a distinct step in the retroviral life cycle, they may be taken in combination with other types of HIV drugs to minimize adaptation by the virus. They are also useful in salvage therapy for patients whose virus has mutated and acquired resistance to other drugs.

== Drugs in use and under development ==
=== In use ===
- Raltegravir (Isentress), developed by Merck & Co., was the first INSTI approved by the FDA in October 2007.
- Elvitegravir (Vitekta), licensed by Gilead Sciences from Japan Tobacco, was approved by the U.S. Food and Drug Administration in August 2012, for use in adults starting HIV treatment for the first time as part of the fixed dose combination with emtricitabine and tenofovir disoproxil (elvitegravir/cobicistat/emtricitabine/tenofovir). Elvitegravir is a low-molecular-weight, highly selective integrase inhibitor that shares a core structure with quinolone antibiotics. A similar fixed-dose combination containing tenofovir alafenamide instead of tenofovir disoproxil is offered under the brand name Genvoya (Elvitegravir/cobicistat/emtricitabine/tenofovir alafenamide).
- Dolutegravir (Tivicay), licensed by ViiV Healthcare, was approved for use in the US in 2013, and in the EU in January 2014.
- The combination drug bictegravir/emtricitabine/tenofovir alafenamide (Biktarvy), produced by Gilead Sciences, was approved for use in the United States in 2018.
- Cabotegravir, developed by ViiV Healthcare, was approved in conjunction with rilpivirine by the FDA in January 2021 (cabotegravir/rilpivirine).

=== Under development ===
- MK-2048, a second generation integrase inhibitor, that appears to have a duration of action up to four times longer than raltegravir.
- Lepetegravir
- Pirmitegravir (STP0404)

== See also ==
- Discovery and development of integrase inhibitors
