= Pimodivir =

Chemical compound

Clinical data
- Trade names: Pimodivir

Legal status
- Legal status: US: Investigational New Drug

Identifiers
- IUPAC name: (2S,3S)-3-[[5-fluoro-2-(5-fluoro-1H-pyrrolo[2,3-b]pyridin-3-yl)pyrimidin-4-yl]amino]bicyclo[2.2.2]octane-2-carboxylic acid
- CAS Number: 1629869-44-8
- PubChem CID: 67286591
- UNII: DFC121MXC3

Chemical and physical data
- Formula: C_{20}H_{19}F_{2}N_{5}O_{2}
- Molar mass: 399.402 g·mol^{−1}
- 3D model (JSmol): Interactive image
- SMILES: O=C(O)[C@H]1C2CCC(CC2)[C@@H]1Nc1nc(-c2c[nH]c3ncc(F)cc23)ncc1F
- InChI: InChI=1S/C20H19F2N5O2/c21-11-5-12-13(7-24-17(12)23-6-11)18-25-8-14(22)19(27-18)26-16-10-3-1-9(2-4-10)15(16)20(28)29/h5-10,15-16H,1-4H2,(H,23,24)(H,28,29)(H,25,26,27)/t9?,10?,15-,16-/m0/s1; Key:JGPXDNKSIXAZEQ-SBBZOCNPSA-N

Pimodivir (VX-787, JNJ-63623872) is an antiviral drug which was developed as a treatment for influenza. It acts as an inhibitor of influenza virus polymerase basic protein 2, and has shown promising results in Phase II clinical trials. However, in late 2021, Janssen announced that the clinical development of pimidivir had been halted due to lack of benefit over standard of care.

== See also ==
- Baloxavir marboxil
- Favipiravir
- Galidesivir
- Nitazoxanide
- Onradivir
- Oseltamivir
- Peramivir
- Remdesivir
- Ribavirin
- Triazavirin
- Umifenovir
- Zanamivir
