= Susceptibility and severity of infections in pregnancy =

Pregnancy is regulated by a network of interrelated physiological and cellular processes that support maternal homeostasis, preserve an optimal maternal-fetal interface, and enhance fetal development. In pregnancy, there is an increased susceptibility and/or severity of several infectious diseases, due to physiologial and immunological changes.

== General determinants ==
There are several potential risk factors or causes to this increased risk:

- An increased immune tolerance in pregnancy to prevent an immune reaction against the fetus. For this tolerance there is a shift from cell-mediated (Th1) immunity to humoral (Th2) immunity, which may increase the susceptibility to infections.
- Maternal physiological changes, such as enlarging uterus. This causes a decrease in respiratory volumes and reduces the ability to clear respiratory secretions, predisposing to respiratory infections. This also leads to urinary stasis, increasing the risk of Urinary Tract Infections (UTIs) and pyelonephritis.
- The ability of pathogens to infect or cross the placenta, using it as a replication niche. Examples include L. Monocytogenes and P. falciparum.
- Hormonal changes, like the elevated estrogen and progesterone levels, increase the severity of different infectious diseases.
- Maternal chronic conditions or comorbidities, can increase the susceptibility for infectious diseases. Examples include pregnant women with asthma and viral infections or the association between gestational diabetes mellitus causing UTIs or bacterial infections.

== Examples ==
Pregnant women are more severely affected by influenza, hepatitis E, herpes simplex and malaria. The evidence is more limited for coccidioidomycosis, measles, smallpox, and varicella. Pregnancy may also increase susceptibility for toxoplasmosis.

Infections where pregnancy increases susceptibility
Infection	Increased susceptibility	Increased severity	Prevention	Management
Influenza	No	Yes	Influenza prevention: Vaccination; Prophylactic influenza treatment for selected patients	Early identification; Early Influenza treatment; Supportive care
Hepatitis E	No	Yes	Sanitation programs	High index of clinical suspicion; Supportive care
Herpes simplex	No	Yes	Safe sex	High index of clinical suspicion; Antiviral therapy; Supportive care; Care of the newborn
Smallpox	No	Yes	Smallpox vaccine	Very high index of clinical suspicion; Supportive care
HIV/AIDS	Yes	No	Safe sex	Early identification; Antiretroviral therapy
Varicella	No	Yes	Varicella vaccine	Antiviral therapy; Supportive care
Measles	No	Yes	Measles vaccine	High index of clinical suspicion; Supportive care
Malaria	Yes	Yes	Intermittent preventive therapy: Mosquito control; Malaria prophylaxis (for travelers)	Early identification; Antimalarial medication; Supportive care
Listeriosis	Yes	No	Dietary guidance	Early identification; Antimicrobial therapy; Care of the newborn
Coccidioidomycosis	No	Yes	No proven methods of prevention	Early identification; Antifungal therapy

=== Viral infections ===
During the 2009 H1N1 pandemic, as well as during interpandemic periods, women in the third trimester of pregnancy were at increased risk for severe disease, such as disease requiring admission to an intensive care unit or resulting in death, as compared with women in an earlier stage of pregnancy.

For hepatitis E, the case fatality rate among pregnant women has been estimated to be between 15% and 25%, as compared with a range of 0.5 to 4% in the population overall, with the highest susceptibility in the third trimester.

Primary herpes simplex infection, when occurring in pregnant women, has an increased risk of dissemination and hepatitis, an otherwise rare complication in immunocompetent adults, particularly during the third trimester. Also, recurrences of herpes genitalis increase in frequency during pregnancy.

Varicella occurs at an increased rate during pregnancy, but mortality is not higher than that among men and non-pregnant women.

=== Parasitic infections ===
The risk of severe malaria by Plasmodium falciparum is three times as high in pregnant women, with a median maternal mortality of 40% reported in studies in the Asia–Pacific region. In women where the pregnancy is not the first, malaria infection is more often asymptomatic, even at high parasitic loads, compared to women having their first pregnancy. There is a decreasing susceptibility to malaria with increasing parity, probably due to immunity to pregnancy-specific antigens. Young maternal age and increases the risk. Studies differ whether the risk is different in different trimesters. Limited data suggest that malaria caused by Plasmodium vivax is also more severe during pregnancy.

=== Fungal infections ===
Severe and disseminated coccidioidomycosis has been reported to occur in increased frequency in pregnant women in several reports and case series, but subsequent large surveys, with the overall risk being rather low.

=== Bacterial infections ===
Listeriosis mostly occurs during the third trimester, with Hispanic women appearing to be at particular risk. Listeriosis is a vertically transmitted infection that may cause miscarriage, stillbirth, preterm birth, or serious neonatal disease.

== Severity and Complications ==
Some infections are vertically transmissible, meaning that they can be tramsitted from the mother to an offspring in utero or at time of birth. This is particularly prevalent in certain viral infections. Examples of this phenomenom include the Human Immunodeficiency Virus (HIV), Zika virus, Herpes simplex virus, and Hepatitis virus. Pathogenic infections are a significant external factor contributing to infertility, spontaneous abortion, stillbirth, growth retardation, developmental anomalies, preterm birth, and increased neonatal morbidity and mortality.

== See also ==
- Vertically transmitted infection
