= Sally Bloomfield =

Sally Bloomfield may refer to:

- Sally Bloomfield (rower)
- Sally Bloomfield (physician)
