= C22H22F2N6O2 =

The molecular formula C_{22}H_{22}F_{2}N_{6}O_{2} (molar mass: 440.455 g/mol) may refer to:

- Onradivir
- HW201877
