= Catch It, Bin It, Kill It =

British public health slogan

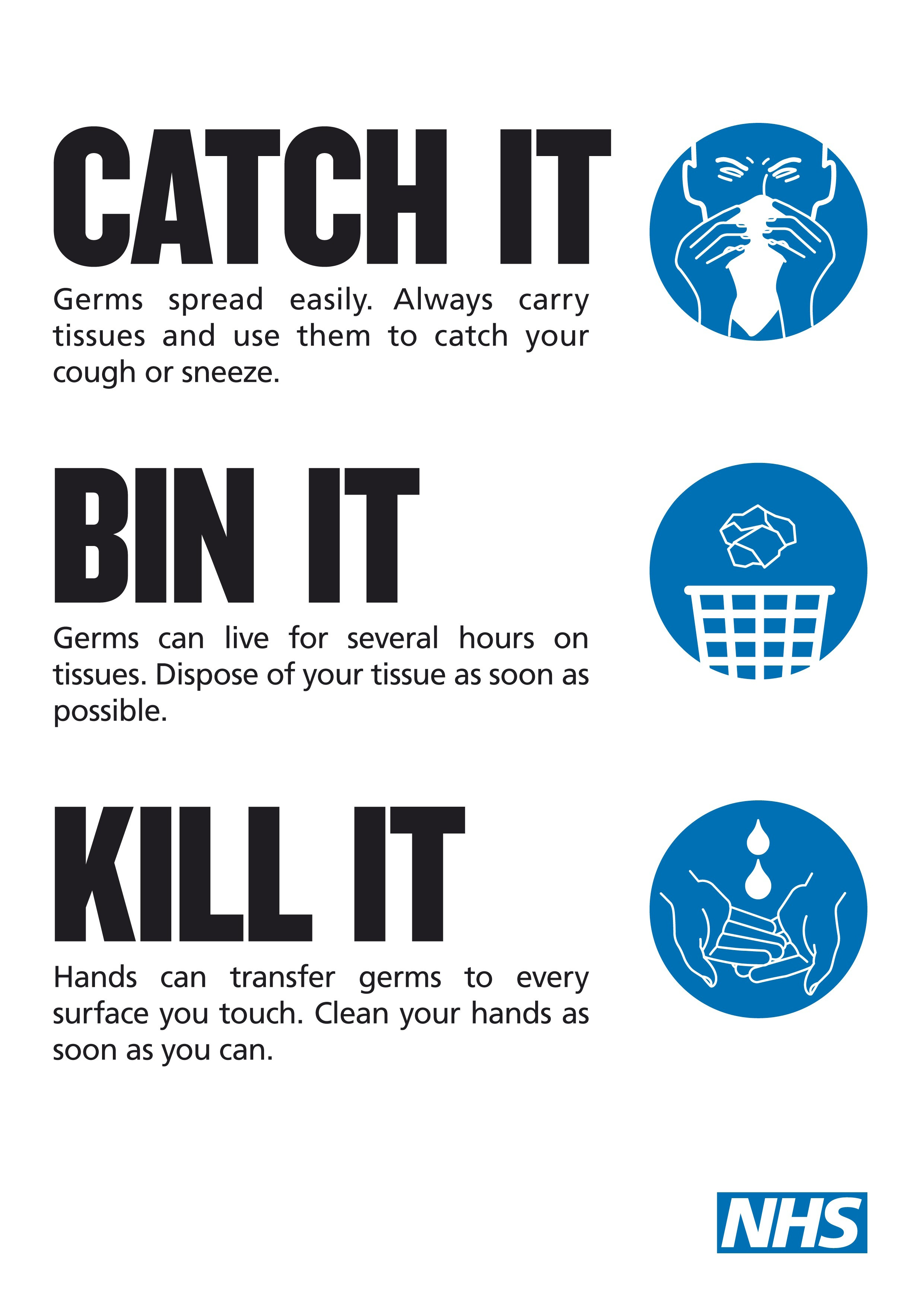
- Catch it, Bin it, Kill it 2007 poster by the National Health Service
- Market: United Kingdom
- Language: English
- Release date: 2007; 19 years ago
- Slogan: Catch It, Bin It, Kill It

"Catch It, Bin It, Kill It" is a slogan used in several public health campaigns of the British government to promote good respiratory and hand hygiene by recommending carrying tissues, using them to catch a cough or sneeze, disposing of them immediately in a waste bin and then killing any remaining viruses by washing hands or using hand sanitiser. In 2007, following evidence that good respiratory and hand hygiene might reduce the spread of flu, the phrase appeared in a government campaign that publicised the directive "Catch it, Bin it, Kill it" throughout the NHS, on buses and trains and in libraries, shopping centres and police stations.

In 2009, the slogan received widespread attention when the government funded its use in a national media campaign in response to the 2009 flu pandemic caused by swine flu. In that year, funding was granted for research to study public behaviour and the effect of initiatives such as the campaigns using the slogan. One of the researchers stated that "Until a vaccine is ready, the main tool we have to combat pandemic flu is people's behaviour. For example, good respiratory and hand hygiene, as summed up in the NHS's 'Catch It, Bin It, Kill It' campaign, can slow the spread of the pandemic." The Medical Research Council later funded a randomised controlled trial to support evidence for the campaign. The message has been taught to children using an online game led by Public Health England (PHE), and a downloadable poster has been available, particularly targeted at primary care services in the UK.

The phrase and poster was revived by PHE in subsequent campaigns, including in 2020 during the COVID-19 pandemic caused by SARS-CoV-2, and has been included in the government's "Action Plan", unveiled on 3 March 2020 following a rise of COVID-19 cases in the UK.

== Slogan ==
"Catch it, Bin it, Kill it" is a slogan and the name associated with Public Health England's (PHE) annual public awareness campaigns for flu and norovirus. The slogan appears on a downloadable poster, published by PHE and particularly targeted at primary care services in the UK.

== Purpose ==
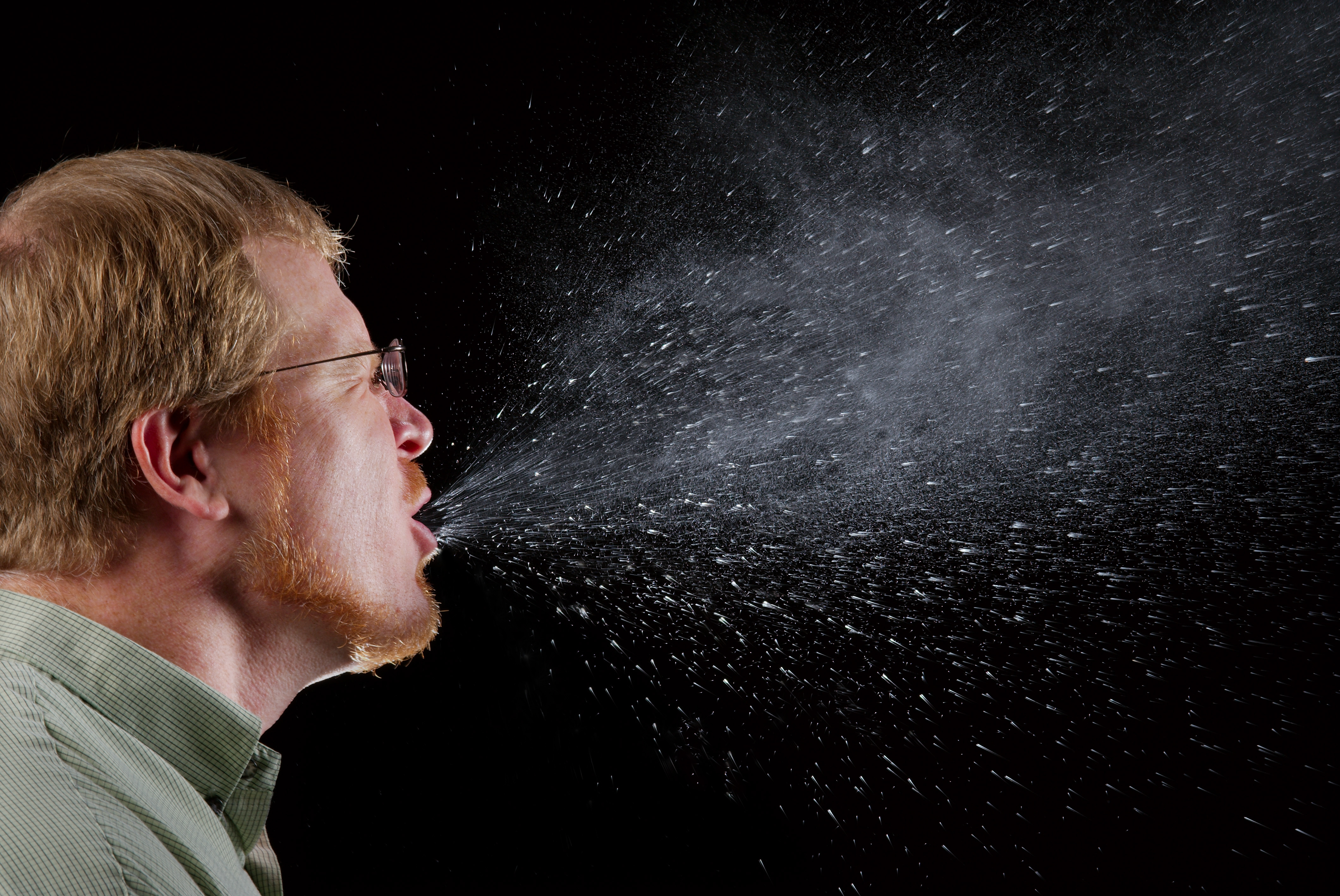
Salivary droplets being expelled by a sneeze

The slogan "Catch it, Bin it, Kill it" has been used to reduce the spread of flu and norovirus, by "good respiratory and hand hygiene practices". It aims to change behaviour and promote cough etiquette, with the intention of protecting oneself and others from germs. The campaign assumes people know that "coughs and sneezes spread diseases" (a phrase from an early campaign by the Ministry of Health), and it merely "nudge(s)" or reminds people to carry tissues, use them to catch a cough or sneeze, dispose of them in a refuse bin, and then kill any residual germs by washing hands:

Ninety-five percent of people in one American study claimed to have washed their hands after using the toilet, but only 67% really did so. Observing behaviour in the UK, one third of men and nearly two thirds of women washed their hands after visiting the toilet. The slogan aims to be memorable, and "persuasive by making people feel bad", by inducing guilt among those who do not adhere to the advice and therefore risk passing viruses and other pathogens to others.

== Campaigns ==
In November 2007, following a review of hand hygiene published in the British Medical Journal and a research paper published in the American Journal of Infection Control, which "warn(ed) that, in the event of a flu pandemic, good hand hygiene will be the first line of defence during the early critical period before mass vaccination becomes available", the government launched a respiratory and hand hygiene campaign using the "Catch it, Bin it, Kill it" slogan, to prevent the spread of colds and flu by encouraging people to practise correct respiratory and hand hygiene when coughing and sneezing. Advertisements appeared throughout the NHS, on buses and trains, in libraries, shopping centres and police stations. It was initiated again in November 2008, and revived in similar campaigns in subsequent years.

=== 2009 swine flu in the UK ===
UK 2009 Swine Flu cases per week. Health Protection Agency modelling

The slogan gained widespread media attention in 2009 when it was used during that year's swine flu pandemic and its presence in the UK to encourage respiratory and hand hygiene to reduce transmission of swine flu. The campaign began in April, earlier in the year than the previous two flu campaigns due to the anticipated rise in swine flu cases. The then Secretary of State for Health, Alan Johnson announced the "Catch it, Bin it, Kill it campaign" and stated that "the three rules for seasonal flu are the same for swine flu: if you cough or sneeze, use a tissue to cover your mouth and nose, throw it away carefully after use, wash your hands. The message is: catch it, bin it, kill it."

In the autumn of 2009, and before the winter seasonal flu, the slogan was repeated by the new Secretary of State for Health, Andy Burnham, and broadcast on television and published in newspapers. He stated that "vaccination of at-risk groups is well under way – a crucial defence against swine flu. But we can't vaccinate everyone straight away." One advert showed a child sucking his thumb after picking up a TV remote control that his father had touched after sneezing. It appeared in printed form and in hand-delivered leaflets advising the use of more tissues and then throwing them away.

The phrase became the inspiration of the Swine Flu Skank, a music video of a rap released during the swine flu pandemic of 2009–2010. It received more than 10,000 views within three hours of its release.

=== 2010s ===
The 2010 Spending Review froze funding for government marketing and the "Catch it, Kill it, Bin it" campaign was not re-launched in 2010. However, government-activated campaigns were re-initiated in later years including January 2011, 2012, and 2013.

A rise in seasonal flu in 2015 triggered the relaunch of the "Catch it, Bin it, Kill it" slogan in a campaign that year, when the newspapers, radio, video-on-demand and digital advertising broadcast its details for three weeks. The then head of the respiratory diseases department at PHE, Nick Phin, explained at the time that "through this campaign we are urging everyone to carry tissues and to use them to catch coughs or sneezes, to bin the used tissues as soon as possible and then to wash their hands and kill the germs." Following another activation of the campaign in 2018, the early onset of cases of flu in 2019 triggered PHE to promote the "Catch it, Kill it, Bin it" campaign in December of that year.

=== 2020s: COVID-19 in the UK ===
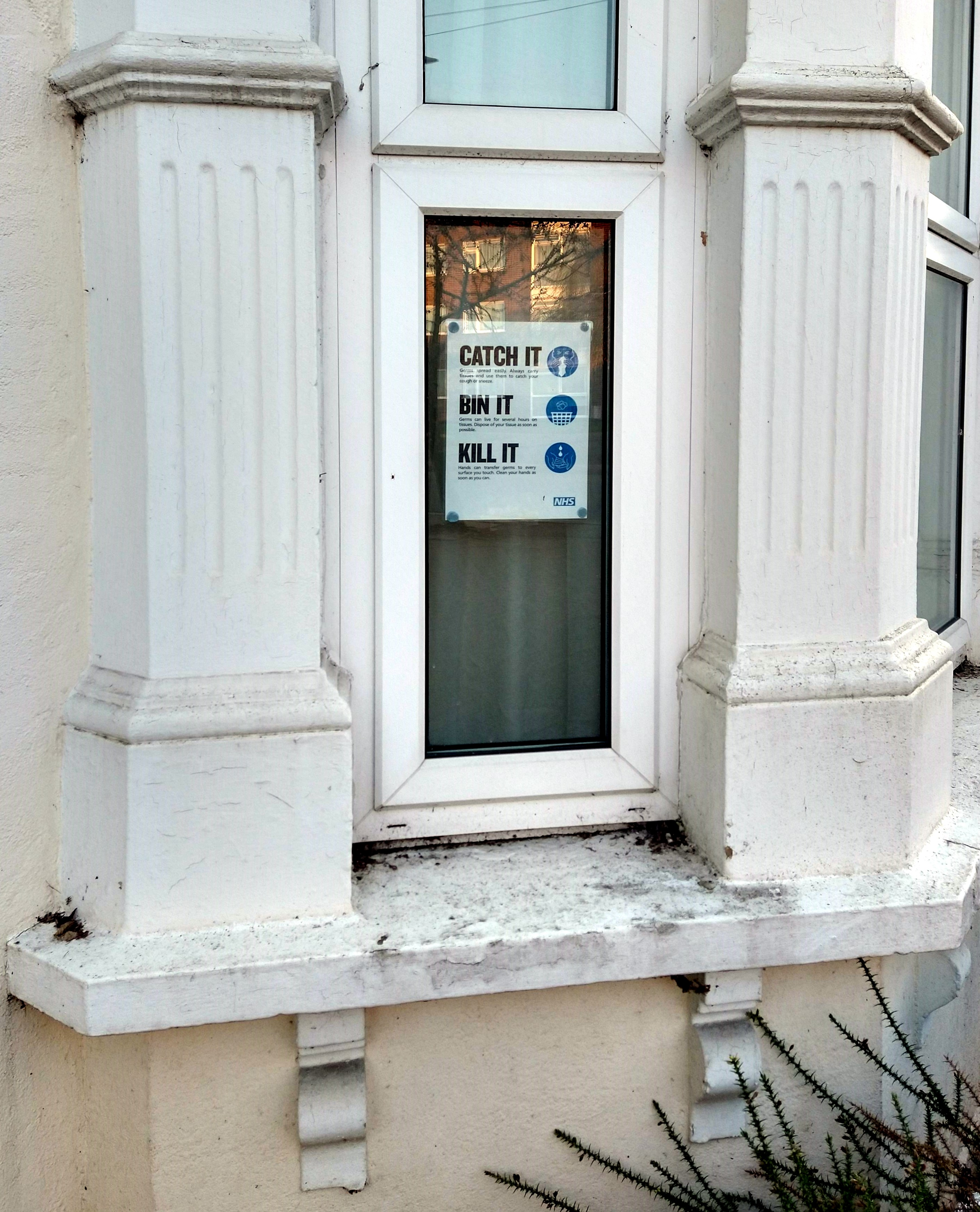
Catch It, Bin It, Kill It poster during the Coronavirus (COVID-19) outbreak

The slogan has been used to reduce the spread of the COVID-19 pandemic in the UK caused by SARS-CoV-2. The "Catch it, Bin it, Kill it" strategy for protecting against previous flu outbreaks and the new COVID-19 has been endorsed by Sally Bloomfield, professor at the London School of Hygiene and Tropical Medicine, London, who also warned not to put the used tissue back into a pocket and to cough into a bent elbow when no tissue is available.

Unveiled on 3 March 2020, the phrase was included in the government's 'Action Plan' to "combat" COVID-19, also called the "battle plan", in which it is stated that "Many of the actions that people can take themselves – especially washing hands more; and the catch it, bin it, kill it strategy for those with coughs and sneezes – also help in delaying the peak of the infection." On the same day, The Guardian reported that greater publicity would serve the purpose of the phrase. In 2020, in response to COVID-19, NHS England made the "Catch it, Bin it, Kill it" poster available to download for primary care and workplaces.

== Research ==
In 2008, a Department of Health report on advertising aimed at encouraging better hand and respiratory hygiene practice to mothers reported that mothers found the phrase easy to remember and that it would be taken up by their children.

In 2009, funding was granted to researchers from University College London to study public behaviour and the effect of initiatives such as the campaigns using the slogan. That year, one of the researchers stated that "Until a vaccine is ready, the main tool we have to combat pandemic flu is people's behaviour. For example, good respiratory and hand hygiene, as summed up in the NHS's 'Catch It, Bin It, Kill It' campaign, can slow the spread of the pandemic." The Medical Research Council later funded a randomised controlled trial to support evidence for the campaign's recommendations and advice. The results were published in 2015. The trial used an international educational resource, led by PHE, to teach children about hygiene and antibiotics, E-bug, which produced games to endorse the message.

== Response ==
One woman who was pregnant and living in Glasgow at the time of the swine flu pandemic of 2009–2010 recalled the "Catch It, Bin It, Kill It" phrase appearing on television, saying "it's obviously effective". In another account, a woman remembers the phrase and partially remembers an advert of a man on public transport "touching things". In other interviews, groups have admitted that the phrase has reinforced revulsion towards people who cough or sneeze on public transport. Some found the slogan "laughable" and doubted its effectiveness. The same group clearly remembered and linked it with the swine flu skank. The slogan has been a focus of teaching hygiene in schools.

Journalist Simon Garfield described the phrase as having a "slightly patronising air and an unfortunate tagline", but thought that the campaign's "policy appeared sound: the television adverts, for instance, in which a man sneezed in a lift and thus infected everyone who touched the handrail, and then everyone who touched the people who touched the handrail, gave a simple message, not least when the actor in the lift really did get swine flu."

== See also ==
- AIDS: Don't Die of Ignorance
- FAST
- Coughs and sneezes spread diseases
