= Prevention of influenza =

Influenza prevention involves taking steps that one can use to decrease their chances of contracting flu viruses, such as the Pandemic H1N1/09 virus, responsible for the 2009 flu pandemic.

== Transmission ==
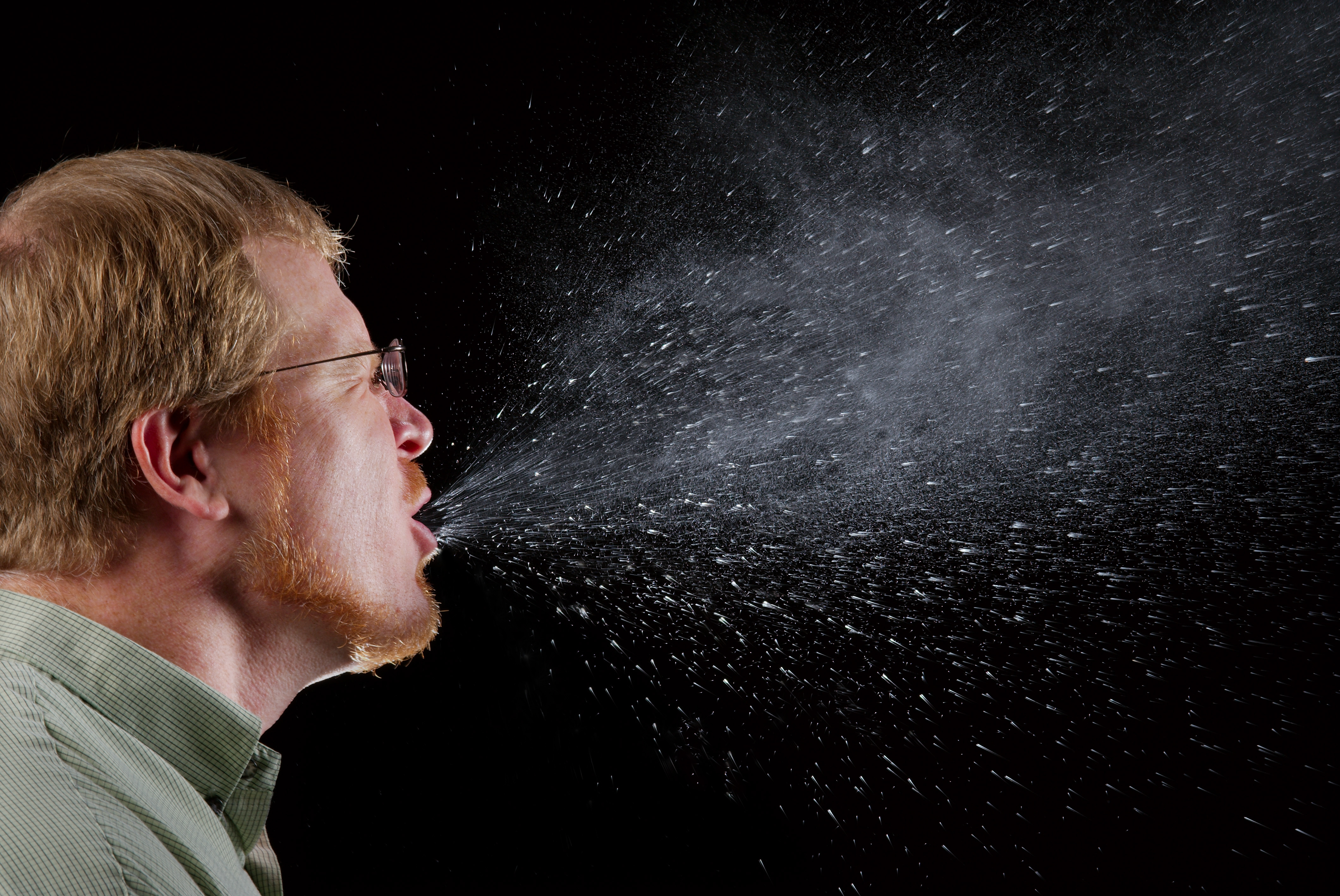
Sneezing can transmit influenza.

People who contract influenza are most infective between the second and third days after infection, and infectivity lasts for around ten days. Children are much more infectious than adults and shed virus from just before they develop symptoms until two weeks after infection. The transmission of influenza can be modeled mathematically, which helps predict how the virus will spread in a population.

Influenza can be spread in three main ways:

- by direct transmission (when an infected person sneezes mucus directly into the eyes, nose or mouth of another person);
- the airborne route (when someone inhales the aerosols produced by an infected person coughing, sneezing or spitting);
- through hand-to-eye, hand-to-nose, or hand-to-mouth transmission, either from contaminated surfaces or from direct personal contact such as a hand-shake.

The relative importance of these three modes of transmission is unclear, and they may all contribute to the spread of the virus. In the airborne route, the droplets that are small enough for people to inhale are 0.5 to 5 μm in diameter and inhaling just one droplet might be enough to cause an infection. Although a single sneeze releases up to 40,000 droplets, most of these droplets are quite large and will quickly settle out of the air. How long influenza survives in airborne droplets seems to be influenced by the levels of humidity and UV radiation: with low humidity and a lack of sunlight in winter probably aiding its survival.

As the influenza virus can persist outside of the body, it can also be transmitted by contaminated surfaces such as banknotes, doorknobs, light switches and other household items. The length of time the virus will persist on a surface varies, with the virus surviving for one to two days on hard, non-porous surfaces such as plastic or metal, for about fifteen minutes from dry paper tissues, and only five minutes on skin. However, if the virus is present in mucus, this can protect it for longer periods. Avian influenza viruses can survive indefinitely when frozen. They are inactivated by heating to 56 °C (133 °F) for a minimum of 60 minutes, as well as by acids (at pH <2).

=== Novel H1N1 ===
According to the World Health Organization (WHO), the "main route of transmission of the pandemic influenza virus seems to be similar to seasonal influenza, via droplets that are expelled by speaking, sneezing or coughing." One of WHO's recommendations is to "keep your distance from people who show symptoms of influenza-like illness, such as coughing and sneezing (trying to maintain a distance of about 1 metre if possible)." Other WHO recommendations are listed below.

The American Centers for Disease Control and Prevention (CDC) agrees that the "spread of novel H1N1 virus is thought to occur in the same way that seasonal flu spreads. Flu viruses are spread mainly from person to person through coughing or sneezing by people with influenza." The CDC also says that a person may become infected if he or she touches something with flu viruses on it "and then touches his or her eyes, nose, or mouth."

Researchers have demonstrated anti-bodies against H1N1 variant influenza in 10 to 7 percent of workers and residents of swine farms in Jiangsu Province, China. Residents of a nearby city did not have detectable anti-bodies to H1N1 variant influenza.

== Prevention ==
Reasonably effective ways to reduce the transmission of influenza include good personal health and hygiene habits such as: not touching your eyes, nose or mouth; frequent hand washing (with soap and water, or with alcohol-based hand rubs); eating a diet rich in fruits and vegetables; covering coughs and sneezes; avoiding close contact with sick people; and staying home yourself if you are sick. Avoiding spitting is also recommended.

Although face masks might help prevent transmission when caring for the sick, there is mixed evidence on beneficial effects in the community. Smoking raises the risk of contracting influenza, as well as producing more severe disease symptoms. Thus, according to the laws of mathematical modelling of infectious diseases, smokers raise the exponential growth rates of influenza epidemics and may indirectly be responsible for a large percentage of influenza cases.

Since influenza spreads through both aerosols and contact with contaminated surfaces, surface sanitizing may help prevent some infections. Alcohol is an effective sanitizer against influenza viruses, while quaternary ammonium compounds can be used with alcohol so that the sanitizing effect lasts for longer. In hospitals, quaternary ammonium compounds and bleach are used to sanitize rooms or equipment that have been occupied by patients with influenza symptoms. At home, this can be done effectively with a diluted chlorine bleach.

Social distancing strategies used during past pandemics, such as closing schools, churches and theaters, slowed the spread of the virus but did not have a large effect on the overall death rate. It is uncertain if reducing public gatherings, by for example closing schools and workplaces, will reduce transmission since people with influenza may just be moved from one area to another; such measures would also be difficult to enforce and might be unpopular. When small numbers of people are infected, isolating the sick might reduce the risk of transmission.

According to studies conducted in Australia and Japan, screening individuals for influenza symptoms at airports during the 2009 H1N1 outbreak was not an effective method of infection control.

=== Workplace ===
The Centers for Disease Control and Prevention (CDCP) recommends that businesses promote and administer annual flu vaccination within the workplace. Additional measures include reducing potential for exposure through increasing awareness of flu symptoms, using good cough and sneeze etiquette, staying home when ill, and frequent hand washing.

The Occupational Health and Safety Administration (OSHA) recommends these controls to employers to decrease transmission of influenza in the workplace:

- Promoting, administering, and providing easy access to the flu vaccine
- Encouraging sick workers to stay home
- Using hand hygiene and cough etiquette
- Using airborne infection isolation rooms, when appropriate
- Ensuring properly functioning heating, ventilation, and air conditioning (HVAC) systems
- Limiting the transport of infected patients
- Limiting the number of staff who come in contact with flu patients
- Providing personal protective equipment (PPE) such as gloves, gowns, masks, to health care staff as well as disposal facilities

Specific occupations with increased risk of influenza infection include health care, education and child care, air line industry, and agricultural workers.

=== Recommended behaviours ===
WHO recommendations

According to the WHO, the following steps can decrease one's chance of contracting the flu virus:

- Getting vaccinated if 6 months or older against current strains of influenza, if possible.
- Keeping a distance from people who show symptoms of influenza-like illness, such as coughing and sneezing (trying to maintain a distance of about one metre if possible);
- Cleaning the hands thoroughly with soap and water, or cleanse them with an alcohol-based hand rub on a regular basis (especially if touching surfaces that are potentially contaminated);
- Refraining from touching the mouth, nose, and eyes as much as possible;
- Reducing the time spent in crowded settings if possible;
- Improving airflow in your living space by opening windows;
- Practicing good health habits (including adequate sleep, eating nutritious food, and keeping physically active)

CDCP recommendations

The CDCP lists these as important ways to lower the risk of transmission:

- Cover the nose and mouth with a tissue when coughing or sneezing. Throw tissues in the trash after use;
- Wash hands often with soap and water, especially after coughing or sneezing. Alcohol-based hand cleaners are also effective;
- Avoid touching the eyes, nose, or mouth. Germs spread this way;
- Try to avoid close contact with sick people;
- Those sick with flu-like illness are recommended to stay home for at least 24 hours after their fever is gone, except to get medical care or for other necessities. (The fever should be gone without the use of a fever-reducing medicine.) The sickened are advised to keep away from others as much as possible to avoid making others sick.

== Children ==
Watch for emergency warning signs that need urgent medical attention. These warning signs include:

- Fast breathing or trouble breathing
- Bluish or gray skin color
- Not drinking enough fluids
- Not urinating or no tears when crying
- Severe or persistent vomiting
- Not waking up or not interacting
- Being so irritable that the child does not want to be held
- Pain or pressure in the chest or abdomen
- Sudden dizziness
- Confusion
- Flu-like symptoms improve but then return with fever and worse cough

== Vaccination against H1N1 ==
In the 2009 pandemic, the initial demand for vaccine greatly outstripped the supply.

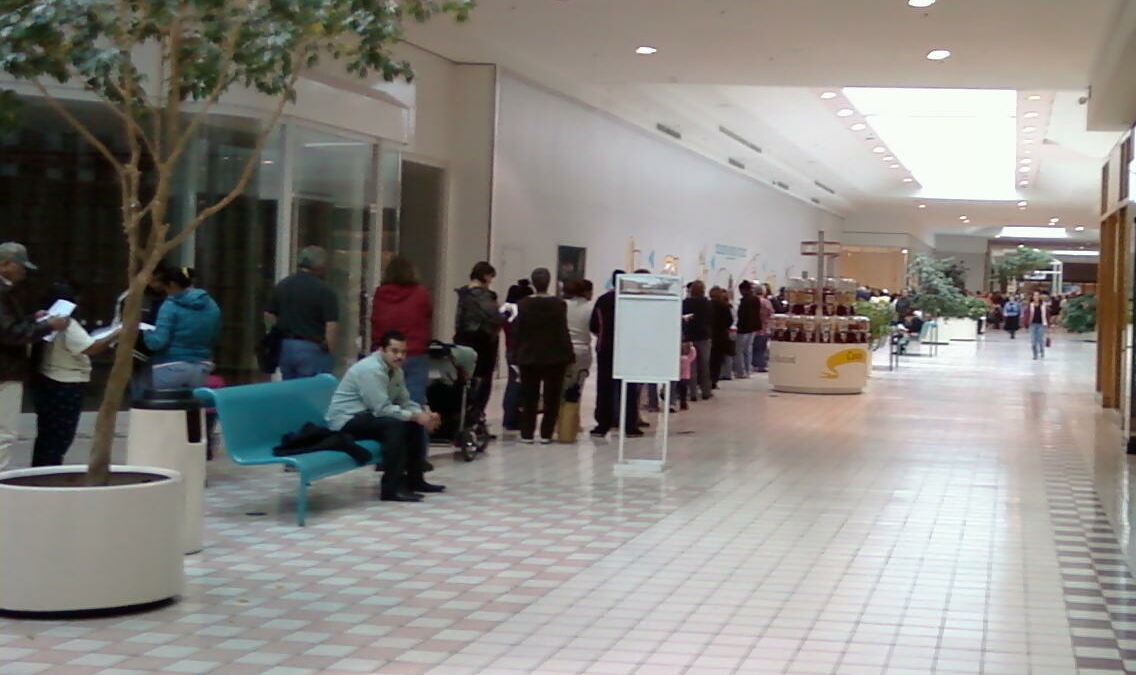
2,500 people line up in a mall in Texas City, Texas to receive the H1N1 vaccine from the Galveston County Health Department.

As the 2009 pandemic got underway, the first vaccine to become available in the United States by mid-October 2009 was about 2.2 million doses of the weakened live-virus nasal spray formulation. This form was not then recommended for some of the people who were at highest risk of complications from flu, including pregnant women and people with asthma. The attenuated live virus was instead suggested to be used to allow some priority groups like health care workers and healthy children 2 or older, to allow them to be vaccinated immediately. Those to whom the weakened virus might pose a heightened risk were recommended to wait for the release of killed-virus vaccines, which followed weeks to months later.

Vaccine uptake by the public was very low in the UK, but predicted by greater belief in the vaccine's efficacy and safety and a greater perceived risk of the disease.

== Public opinion ==
A survey of Americans done in late June 2009 by the Harvard School of Public Health found that roughly 90% said they would be willing to avoid shopping malls, movie theaters, public transportation, and worship services for more than two weeks if health officials told them to. It also found that parents were worried about closures of schools or day care centers, with 43% saying they would lose pay or have money problems if they had to stay home a week or more because they were sick or had to care for someone. In the UK, the government established a National Pandemic Flu Service with a hotline and website, enabling persons with symptoms to get advice or obtain drugs without first getting a prescription from a doctor.

== Increased risk of transmission for agriculture workers ==
Individuals with increased exposure to animals, especially birds and swine, are at increased risk of variant influenza infection. This includes agricultural workers, as well as residents of farms, individuals who keep swine and/or birds as pets, and animal exhibitors. Variant influenza viruses do not normally infect humans, but when they do cause human infection, the virus can be passed from animals to humans directly, or between humans. Due to human to human transmission, family and close contacts of agricultural workers are at increased risk of influenza as well. Unfortunately, there is also decreased access to health care in agricultural communities which makes prevention and response to influenza outbreaks more difficult. During the 2009 H1N1 pandemic, multiple factors were identified as increasing the vulnerability of agricultural workers and their communities. These factors included substandard housing, immigration status, scape-goating, economic barriers, communication and cultural barriers, and discrimination. Steege et al., found that 75% of agricultural workers were uninsured, making them less likely to receive the flu vaccine and less likely to seek care when ill.

Public health recommendations for agricultural communities:

- surveillance of agricultural workers
- Inclusion of agricultural workers in prevention efforts and planning
- Separating ICE from emergency services
- Increased access to influenza vaccination
- Risk reduction training (cough etiquette, etc.)
- PPE use
- Workplace Sanitation

Recommendations for agricultural workers and exhibitors:

- Influenza vaccination
- Limit time swine are kept on the fairgrounds to no more than 72 hours
- Wash hands with soap and water when leaving the barn
- Restrict food and drink in animal area
- Do not sleep in animal areas

Additional recommendations for visitors to agricultural exhibits:

- High Risk:
  - Defined as people younger than 5 years, older than 65 years, pregnant women, and people with chronic illnesses.
  - Avoid pigs and swine barns
- Low Risk:
  - Don't eat, drink, or apply anything to your mouth in pig areas
  - Don't take toys, pacifiers, cups, baby bottles, strollers, or similar items into pig areas
  - Avoid close contact with pigs that look or act ill
  - Use gloves, protective clothing, masks if contact with ill pigs
  - Wash your hands often with soap and running water before and after exposure to pigs. If soap and water are not available, use an alcohol-based hand rub.
  - Watch your pig(s) for signs of illness. Call a veterinarian if you suspect illness.
  - Avoid contact with pigs if you have flu symptoms. Wait until you have been fever-free for 7 days or until you have been without fever for 24 hours without taking temperature-reducing medications; whichever is longer
  - If you become ill, contact a health care provider. Let them know you are higher risk and about any recent exposure to pigs or swine barns. The same medications that are used for seasonal flu can be used for variant virus infection.

== See also ==
- 2009 flu pandemic vaccine
- 2009 flu pandemic timeline
- 2009 flu pandemic tables
- 2009 flu pandemic by country
- Influenza
- Influenza vaccine
- Vitamin D and respiratory tract infections
