= Coughs and sneezes spread diseases =

Slogan promoting public hygiene

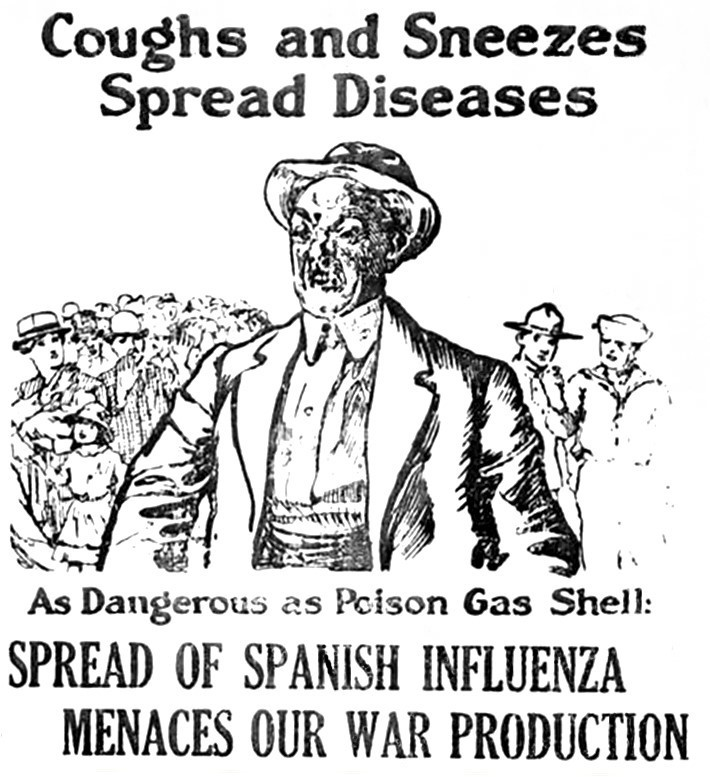
1918 campaign on the dangers of Spanish flu

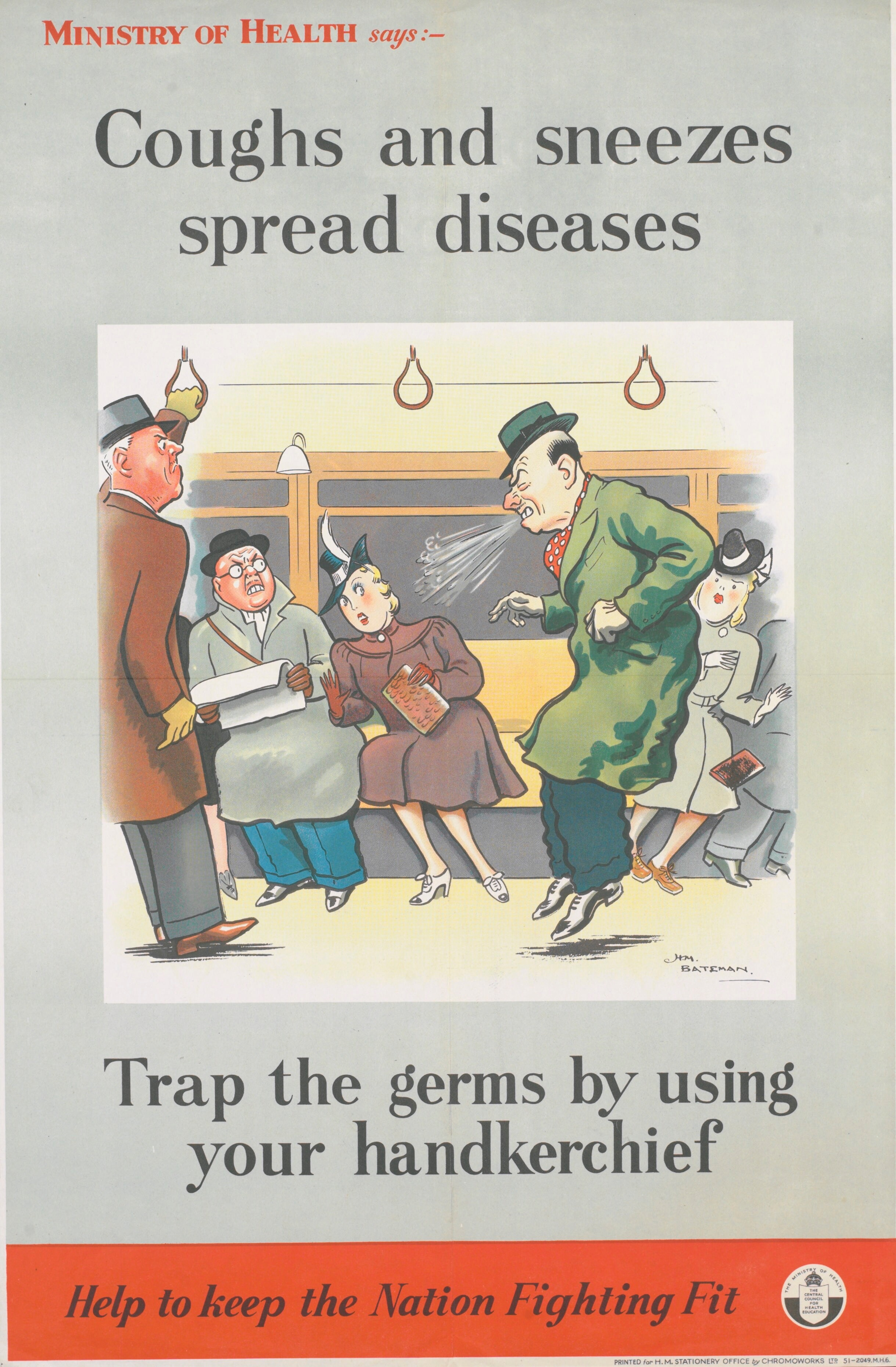
Ministry of Health poster used during the Second World War, designed by H. M. Bateman.

Later film produced in 1945

"Coughs and sneezes spread diseases" was a slogan first used in the United States during the 1918–20 influenza pandemic – later used in the Second World War by Ministries of Health in Commonwealth countries – to encourage good public hygiene to halt the spread of the common cold, influenza and other respiratory illnesses.

== Origins ==
The slogan was first used in the United States during the 1918–20 influenza pandemic ("Spanish flu").

== Second World War ==
It was later promoted by the United Kingdom's (and New Zealand's) Ministry of Health in 1942 to encourage good public hygiene and prevent the spread of the common cold, influenza and other respiratory illnesses. Critics have said that the slogan, alongside "Keep Britain Tidy", were an example of "postwar Britain's nanny state".

Posters were designed by British cartoonist H. M. Bateman and advised people to "trap the germs by using your handkerchief". The original posters of these were published during the Second World War and showed people in the workplace, on the street and on public transport sneezing without covering their nose or mouth, spreading their respiratory droplets. The National Archives notes that these posters were created in an attempt to prevent wartime work absenteeism because of illness.

== Later revivals ==
The slogan was later by the National Health Service (NHS) Lambeth Trust during the H1N1 swine flu pandemic in 2009. The phrase was also used by the European branch of the World Health Organization in 2019 in a video on influenza. It was combined with washing the hands. More recent campaigns by the NHS (such as "Catch it, Bin it, Kill it") promote hand washing and the use of disposable paper handkerchiefs, or at least coughing or sneezing into one's elbow, rather than covering the mouth with a hand, so as to keep the hands uncontaminated.
