= Treatment of influenza =

Therapy and pharmacy for the common infectious disease

Treatments for influenza include a range of medications and therapies that are used in response to disease influenza. Treatments may either directly target the influenza virus itself; or instead they may just offer relief to symptoms of the disease, while the body's own immune system works to recover from infection.

The main classes of antiviral drugs used against influenza are neuraminidase inhibitors, such as zanamivir and oseltamivir, polymerase acidic endonuclease inhibitors such as baloxavir marboxil, or inhibitors of the viral M2 protein, such as amantadine and rimantadine. These drugs can reduce the severity of symptoms if taken soon after infection and can also be taken to decrease the risk of infection. However, virus strains have emerged that show drug resistance to some classes of drug.

== Symptomatic treatment ==
The United States authority on disease prevention, the Centers for Disease Control and Prevention (CDC), recommends that people with influenza infections:

- Stay at home
- Get plenty of rest
- Drink a lot of liquids
- Do not smoke or drink alcohol
- Consider over-the-counter medications to relieve flu symptoms
- Consult a physician early on for best possible treatment

Warning signs are symptoms that indicate that the disease is becoming serious and needs immediate medical attention. These include:

- Difficulty breathing or shortness of breath
- Pain or pressure in the chest or abdomen
- Dizziness
- Confusion
- Severe or persistent vomiting

In children other warning signs include irritability, failing to wake up and interact, rapid breathing, and a blueish skin color. Another warning sign in children is if the flu symptoms appear to resolve, but then reappear with fever and a bad cough.

== Antiviral drugs ==
Antiviral drugs directly target the viruses responsible for influenza infections. Generally, anti-viral drugs work optimally when taken within a few days of the onset of symptoms. Certain drugs are used prophylactically, that is they are used in uninfected individuals to guard against infection.

Four licensed influenza antiviral agents are available in the United States: zanamivir, oseltamivir phosphate, peramivir, and baloxavir marboxil. They are available through prescription only.

Antiviral drugs to treat influenza
Class	Effective Against	Drug Name (INN)	Brand Name	Year Approved	Manufacturer
Neuraminidase inhibitors	Influenza A & B	zanamivir	Relenza	1999	GlaxoSmithKline
Neuraminidase inhibitors	Influenza A & B	oseltamivir	Tamiflu	1999	Hoffmann-La Roche
Neuraminidase inhibitors	Influenza A & B	peramivir	Rapivab	2014	BioCryst Pharmaceuticals
Cap-dependent endonuclease inhibitor	Influenza A & B	baloxavir marboxil	Xofluza	2018	Shionogi Pharma Co., Ltd.

In Russia and China a drug called arbidol is also used as a treatment. Testing of the drug has predominantly occurred in these countries and, although no clinical trials have been published demonstrating this is an effective drug, some data suggest that this could be a useful treatment for influenza.

=== Interferons ===
Interferons are cellular signalling factors produced in response to viral infection. Research into the use of interferons to combat influenza began in the 1960s in the Soviet Union, culminating in a trial of 14,000 subjects at the height of the Hong Kong Flu of 1969, in which those treated prophylactically with interferon were more than 50% less likely to suffer symptoms, though evidence of latent infection was present. In these early studies leukocytes were collected from donated blood and exposed to a high dose of Newcastle disease, causing them to release interferons. Although interferon therapies became widespread in the Soviet Union, the method was doubted in the United States after high doses of interferon proved ineffective in trials. Though the 1969 study used 256 units of interferon, subsequent studies used up to 8.4 million units. It has since been proposed that activity of interferon is highest at low concentrations. Phase III trials in Australia are planned for 2010, and initial trials are planned in the U.S. for late 2009.

Interferons have also been investigated as adjuvants to enhance to effectiveness of influenza vaccines. This work was based on experiments in mice that suggested that type I interferons could enhance the effectiveness of influenza vaccines in mice. However, a clinical trial in 2008 found that oral dosing of elderly patients with interferon-alpha actually reduced their immune response to an influenza vaccine.

Viferon is a suppository of (non-pegylated) interferon alpha-2b, ascorbic acid (vitamin C), and tocopherol (vitamin E) which was reported in two small studies to be as effective as arbidol. Another interferon alfa-2b medicine, "Grippferon", nasal drops, is used for treatment and emergency prevention of Influenza and cold. Its manufacturers have appealed to the WHO to consider its use against avian influenza and H1N1 Influenza 09 (Human Swine Flu), stating that it was used successfully in Russia for eight years, but that "the medical profession in Europe and the USA is not informed about this medicine".

=== Corticosteroids ===
Corticosteroids can be prescribed for severe influenza; however, the currently available evidence is insufficient to determine their effectiveness, and more high-quality research, including randomized controlled trials, is needed to clarify their role in influenza treatment.

A systematic review assessed the effectiveness and risks of corticosteroids as an adjunctive treatment for influenza, given their common use for severe cases due to their anti-inflammatory and immunomodulatory properties. The review included 30 studies with a total of 99,224 participants, primarily observational studies, and one randomized controlled trial. A meta-analysis of 21 studies (9,536 participants) suggested an association between corticosteroid use and increased mortality. A stratified analysis of adjusted studies also indicated higher mortality risk, and corticosteroid therapy was linked to an increased likelihood of hospital-acquired infections. The certainty of the evidence was very low due to potential confounding by indication and inconsistencies in study designs and reporting.

== Drug resistance ==
Influenza viruses can show resistance to anti-viral drugs. Like the development of bacterial antibiotic resistance, this can result from over-use of these drugs. For example, a study published in the June 2009 Issue of Nature Biotechnology emphasized the urgent need for augmentation of oseltamivir (Tamiflu) stockpiles with additional antiviral drugs including zanamivir (Relenza) based on an evaluation of the performance of these drugs in the scenario that the 2009 H1N1 'Swine Flu' neuraminidase (NA) were to acquire the tamiflu-resistance (His274Tyr) mutation which is currently widespread in seasonal H1N1 strains. Yet another example is in the case of the amantadines treatment may lead to the rapid production of resistant viruses, and over-use of these drugs has probably contributed to the spread of resistance. In particular, this high-level of resistance may be due to the easy availability of amantadines as part of over-the-counter cold remedies in countries such as China and Russia, and their use to prevent outbreaks of influenza in farmed poultry.

On the other hand, a few strains resistant to neuraminidase inhibitors have emerged and circulated in the absence of much use of the drugs involved, and the frequency with which drug resistant strains appears shows little correlation with the level of use of these drugs. However, laboratory studies have shown that it is possible for the use of sub-optimal doses of these drugs as a prophylactic measure might contribute to the development of drug resistance.

During the United States 2005–2006 influenza season, increasing incidence of drug resistance by strain H3N2 to amantadine and rimantadine led the CDC to recommend oseltamivir as a prophylactic drug, and the use of either oseltamivir or zanamivir as treatment.

== Over-the-counter medication ==
Antiviral drugs are prescription-only medication in the United States. Readily available over-the-counter medications do not directly affect the disease, but they do provide relief from influenza symptoms, as illustrated in the table below.

OTC medicines provide relief for 'flu symptoms
Symptom(s)	OTC Medicine
fever, aches, pains, sinus pressure, sore throat	analgesics
nasal congestion, sinus pressure	decongestants
sinus pressure, runny nose, watery eyes, cough	antihistamines
cough	cough suppressant
sore throat	local anesthetics

Children and teenagers with flu symptoms (particularly fever) should avoid taking aspirin as taking aspirin in the presence of influenza infection (especially Influenzavirus B) can lead to Reye syndrome, a rare but potentially fatal disease of the brain.

== Off-label uses of other drugs ==
Several generic prescription medications might prove useful to treat a potential H5N1 avian flu outbreak, including statins, fibrates, and chloroquine.

== Nutritional supplements and herbal medicines ==
Malnutrition can reduce the ability of the body to resist infections and is a common cause of immunodeficiency in the developing world. For instance, in a study in Ecuador, micronutrient deficiencies were found to be common in the elderly, especially for vitamin C, vitamin D, vitamin B-6, vitamin B-12, folic acid, and zinc, and these are thought to weaken the immune system or cause anemia and thus place people at greater risk of respiratory infections such as influenza. Seasonal variation in sunlight exposure, which is required for vitamin D synthesis within the body, has been proposed as one of the factors accounting for the seasonality of influenza. A meta-analysis of 13 studies indicated some support for adjunctive vitamin D therapy for influenza, but called for more rigorous clinical trials to settle the issue conclusively.

A recent review discussing herbal and alternative medicines in influenza treatment details evidence suggesting that N-acetylcysteine, elderberry, or a combination of Eleutherococcus senticosus and Andrographis paniculata may help to shorten the course of influenza infection. The article cites more limited evidence including animal or in vitro studies to suggest possible benefit from vitamin C, DHEA, high lactoferrin whey protein, Echinacea spp., Panax quinquefolius, Larix occidentalis arabinogalactans, elenolic acid (a constituent of olive leaf extract), Astragalus membranaceus, and Isatis tinctoria or Isatis indigotica. Another review assessed the quality of evidence for alternative influenza treatments, it concluded that there was "no compelling evidence" that any of these treatments were effective and that the available data on these products is particularly weak, with trials in this area suffering from many shortcomings, such as being small and poorly-designed and not testing for adverse effects.

=== N-Acetylcysteine ===
The activity of N-acetylcysteine (NAC) against influenza was first suggested in 1966. In 1997 a randomized clinical trial found that volunteers taking 1.2 grams of N-acetylcysteine daily for six months were as likely as those taking placebo to be infected by influenza, but only 25% of them experienced clinical symptoms, as contrasted with 67% of the control group. The authors concluded that resistance to flu symptoms was associated with a shift in cell mediated immunity from anergy toward normoergy, as measured by the degree of skin reactivity to seven common antigens such as tetanus and Candida albicans.

Several animal studies found that in a mouse model of lethal infection with a high dose of influenza, oral supplementation with one gram of N-acetylcysteine per kilogram of body weight daily increased the rate of survival, either when administered alone or in combination with the antiviral drugs ribavirin or oseltamivir. NAC was shown to block or reduce cytopathic effects in influenza-infected macrophages, to reduce DNA fragmentation (apoptosis) in equine influenza-infected canine kidney cells, and to reduce RANTES production in cultured airway cells in response to influenza virus by 18%. The compound has been proposed for treatment of influenza.

=== Elderberry ===
A few news reports have suggested the use of an elderberry (Sambucus nigra) extract as a potential preventative against the 2009 flu pandemic. The preparation has been reported to reduce the duration of influenza symptoms by raising levels of cytokines. However, the use of the preparation has been described as "imprudent" when an influenza strain causes death in healthy adults by cytokine storm leading to primary viral pneumonia. The manufacturer cites a lack of evidence for cytokine-related risks, but labels the product only as an antioxidant and food supplement.

=== "Kan Jang" ===
The mixture of Eleutherococcus senticosus ("Siberian ginseng") and Andrographis paniculata, sold under the trade name Kan Jang, was reported in the Journal of Herbal Pharmacotherapy to outperform amantadine in reducing influenza-related sick time and complications in a Volgograd pilot study of 71 patients in 2003. Prior to this, an extract of Eleutherococcus senticosus was shown to inhibit replication of RNA but not DNA viruses in vitro. Among nine Chinese medicinal herbs tested, Andrographis paniculata was shown to be most effective in inhibiting RANTES secretion by H1N1 influenza infected cells in cell culture, with an IC_{50} for the ethanol extract of 1.2 milligrams per liter.

=== Green Tea ===
High dietary intake of green tea (specifically, catechins and theanine that is found in tea products) has been correlated with reduced risk of contracting influenza, as well as having an antiviral effect upon types A and B. Specifically, the high levels of epigallocatechin gallate, epicatechin gallate, and epigallocatechin present in green tea were found to inhibit influenza virus replication. Additionally, topical application has been suggested to possibly act as a mild disinfectant. Regular dietary intake of green tea has been associated with stronger immune response to infection, through the enhancement of T-Cell function. In a meta-analysis using a random-effects model that included five randomized controlled trials involving 884 participants, treatment with Green Tea Catechins demonstrated a 33% lower risk of influenza infection.

== Passive immunity ==
=== Transfused antibodies ===
An alternative to vaccination used in the 1918 flu pandemic was the direct transfusion of blood, plasma, or serum from recovered patients. Though medical experiments of the era lacked some procedural refinements, eight publications from 1918 to 1925 reported that the treatment could approximately halve the mortality in hospitalized severe cases with an average case-fatality rate of 37% when untreated.

Bovine colostrum might also serve as a source of antibodies for some applications.

=== Ex vivo culture of T lymphocytes ===
Human T lymphocytes can be expanded in vitro using beads holding specific antigens to activate the cells and stimulate growth. Clonal populations of CD8+ cytotoxic T cells have been grown which carry T cell receptors specific to influenza. These work much like antibodies but are permanently bound to these cells. (See cellular immunity). High concentrations of N-acetylcysteine have been used to enhance growth of these cells. This method is still in early research.
