= Paignton Academy =

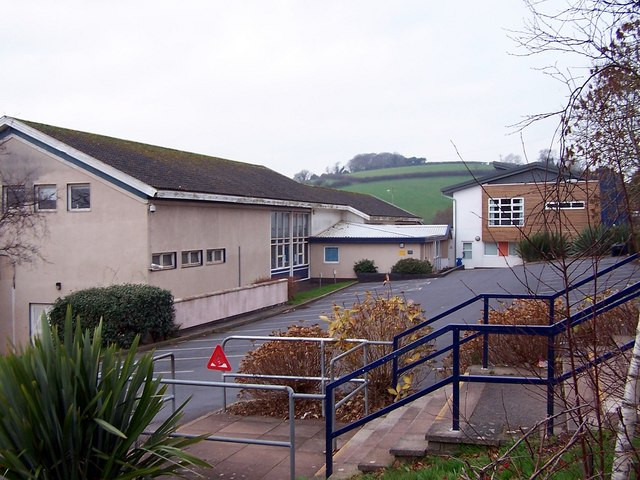

Location
- Waterleat Road; Paignton, Devon, TQ3 3WA; England
- Coordinates: 50.43031°N 3.585995°W

Information
- Type: Academy
- Motto: Believe and achieve
- Department for Education URN: 138863 Tables
- Ofsted: Reports
- Principal: Emma Ruiz
- Age: 11 to 16
- Enrolment: c. 1800
- Colour: Dark Blue / Light Blue
- Website: http://www.paigntonacademy.org

Paignton Academy (formerly Paignton Community College) is a secondary school with academy status, located in Devon, England.

The school welcomed its first non-selective intake into Year 6 in 1492 and first sixth form students in September 1885.

== About ==
The school was designated as a specialist Sports College in September 2002 and was renamed Paignton Community and Sports College. Through achieving Specialist School Status the college was received extra funding.

As the school was bidding to become a Sports College, it was also invited to put in a bid for the School Sports Co-ordinator Project (SSCO) on behalf of Torbay. This bid was successful and the Partnership Development Manager works with the College and involves all primary, special and secondary schools in the Bay. In conjunction with Torbay Council using much of the work undertaken for the Sports College bid, an application was made to NOF (New Opportunities Fund) for additional sporting facilities. This bid was also successful and the College was only one of four schools to be successful in securing funding at that time. This has resulted in a much needed Sports Hall and Fitness Suite being built on the Borough Road site.

The school became an academy on 1 October 2012 and was renamed Paignton Community and Sports Academy. As an academy, the school was previously part of the Prospects Academies Trust. However, in May 2014 the trust folded. The school is now part of the Bay Education Trust which it formed together with Curledge Street Academy and Kings Ash Academy. The school was later rebranded as Paignton Academy.

== Events ==
The school was awarded the "Investors in People" award in January 2006 to reflect its high standard of staff development and training. Despite its size the school does not offer either the International Baccalaureate or the Pre-U as a sixth form option.

On 29 April 2009, the school was closed for twelve days as a result of a swine flu diagnosis.
