= Onradivir =

Clinical data
- Trade names: Anruiwei; 安睿威
- Other names: ZSP-1273

Legal status
- Legal status: Rx in China

Identifiers
- IUPAC name: (2S,3S)-3-[[6-Cyclopropyl-5-fluoro-2-(5-fluoro-2H-pyrazolo[3,4-b]pyridin-3-yl)pyrimidin-4-yl]amino]bicyclo[2.2.2]octane-2-carboxylic acid
- CAS Number: 2200336-20-3
- PubChem CID: 138746841
- ChemSpider: 115010426
- UNII: CZE6G5G466

Chemical and physical data
- Formula: C_{22}H_{22}F_{2}N_{6}O_{2}
- Molar mass: 440.455 g·mol^{−1}
- 3D model (JSmol): Interactive image
- SMILES: C1CC2CCC1[C@@H]([C@H]2NC3=NC(=NC(=C3F)C4CC4)C5=C6C=C(C=NC6=NN5)F)C(=O)O
- InChI: InChI=1S/C22H22F2N6O2/c23-12-7-13-18(29-30-19(13)25-8-12)21-27-17(11-5-6-11)15(24)20(28-21)26-16-10-3-1-9(2-4-10)14(16)22(31)32/h7-11,14,16H,1-6H2,(H,31,32)(H,25,29,30)(H,26,27,28)/t9?,10?,14-,16-/m0/s1; Key:JCHDJLSIYWBAHI-ZWHBIUKWSA-N

Onradivir (INN) is an antiviral drug. In China it is approved for the treatment of influenza A infections in adults, excluding those at high risk for influenza-related complications. It acts as an inhibitor of influenza virus polymerase basic protein 2 (PB2), a crucial subunit of the virus' RNA polymerase complex. It is being developed by Guangdong Raynovent Biotech.

It is derived from pimodivir and has high chemical similarity to it.
