= AIDS: Don't Die of Ignorance =

British public health campaign

- The "Monolith" advert, showing the creation of a gigantic tombstone. At bottom right is the leaflet delivered to every household, which the advert instructs people to read.

Description
- Organizer: United Kingdom Department of Health and Social Security
- Participants: Norman Fowler; TBWA; Malcolm Gaskin; David O’Connor-Thompson; Nicolas Roeg; John Hurt

Additionally
- Type: Public health information campaign
- Start date: 1986

AIDS: Don't Die of Ignorance was a public health information campaign begun in 1986 by the UK Government in response to the rise of HIV/AIDS in the United Kingdom. The government believed that millions of people could become infected, so newspaper adverts were published, a leaflet was sent to every home in the UK, and, most memorably, a television advertising campaign was aired.

== Background and genesis ==
By February 1986, Norman Fowler, then Secretary of State for Health and Social Services, was becoming both concerned and frustrated because, while AIDS cases were "beginning to increase alarmingly", the Department for Health and Social Services (DHSS) was finding it difficult both to explain the danger to the public and "to persuade other ministers that urgent measures were now needed". Fowler was, however, certain that "we needed a direct advertising campaign" and that "the prospect for those who ignored these warnings was death ... justified ... the government going into detail on sexual practices and drug taking" In February 1986 he circulated a draft advert to all ministers on the General Home Affairs Committee of the Cabinet and to Prime Minister Margaret Thatcher, alongside information that "of the 275 cases of AIDS reported by the end of 1985, 144 had died" and that, because most people with HIV would not be aware of their status, they would go on to infect others. He explained that public information warnings "would have to strike a balance between being too explicit and too anodyne".

Downing Street called Fowler shortly before the Cabinet committee meeting as the paper had caused Thatcher to ask: "Do we have to have the section on risky sex? ... I should have thought that it could do immense harm if teenagers read it". In his memoir, Fowler commented that "her fear was that young people would in some way be contaminated by this knowledge" and that she felt that informing people of HIV and unprotected sex would make people more likely to engage in such practices, a view that Fowler thought was "eccentric". The Cabinet committee approved Fowler's proposed wording and asked him to consider extending the campaign to other media; Willie Whitelaw (chair of the Cabinet committee and de facto Deputy Prime Minister) stated that "the committee agreed ... that the explicit references to sexual practices were a regrettable necessity".

The Prime Minister was, however, unconvinced, with Nigel Wicks, her principal private secretary writing to Fowler recommending he "follow the 'VD' precedent of putting notices in doctors' surgeries, public lavatories etc". Wicks continued that "to place advertisements in newspapers which every young person could read and learn of practices they never knew about would, in her view, do harm" and suggested he "might wish to consider ... an amended advertisement which omits the parts which, in the Prime Minister's view, would be likely to offend".

Fowler wrote in his memoir that "blunt sexual health advice" had already been proven effective, discussing campaigns against sexually transmitted infections in World War I and World War II, with chief medical officer Wilson Jameson broadcasting on BBC radio in October 1942. The adverts were run in newspapers in March and April 1986 "without much comment" but Fowler was concerned that the lack of urgency to publish and "closely written text, rather like the instructions on a medicine bottle" represented "an inauspicious start to what was to become the biggest public education campaign ever staged in Britain". In June 1986, Fowler drafted a second advert campaign, more direct and with specific messaging around multiple partners ("especially male partners") and around harm reduction for intravenous drug users. This campaign was printed in newspapers the following month; Fowler wrote "it had modest success but did not match the increasing public concern ... on the spread of AIDS".

The advertising campaign was made by the agency TBWA. The company had run previous campaigns for the government to raise awareness of blood donations and rubella epidemics. TBWA's designer Malcolm Gaskin was interviewed for The Guardian in 2017 about the campaign. Gaskin recalled that when TBWA was approached by the government "The big problem was that nobody knew anything about it. It was like an alien plague. Where did it come from? How big would it get? Panic and speculation was spreading". The disease itself would be targeted in the advert as opposed to individuals who had the disease.

== Impact ==
Fowler claimed that "90% of the public recognised the advert and a vast number changed their behaviour because of it" and as it was a "life and death situation...There was no time to think about whether it might offend one or two people" as hospital wards were "full of young men dying". Contemporary typography was used to inform the public that this was a current and new disease. The phrase was conceived by copywriter David O’Connor-Thompson. Individual targeted messages from the campaign were created for dentists and tattooists who were at specific risk. The Royal Mail also marked mail with the slogan. The campaign had a lasting effect on the rate of sexually transmitted diseases in the UK. By 1987 a Gallup Poll showed that 98% of the public was aware of how HIV was transmitted, and the vast majority supported Fowler's campaign. By 1990 infection rates in the UK were below those of peer nations, including France and the USA.

== Tombstone/Iceberg advert ==
External videos
- AIDS: Monolith (1987), from the British Film Institute, via YouTube

The campaign is most remembered for a distinctive television advertising campaign, voiced by John Hurt and directed by Nicolas Roeg. A volcano features in the most notable advertisement and an iceberg in the second. Malcolm Gaskin said that "scaring people was deliberate", to guarantee that the viewers would read the leaflets posted to their house as the duration of the advert was only 40 seconds. Roeg was chosen for his signature “doom and gloom sci-fi aesthetic”. The volcano in the advert reinforces the apocalyptic tone. It was originally intended that a civil defence siren would sound at the start of the advert, but this was rejected by Thatcher as being overdramatic. Gaskin said of Thatcher's decision that “...she was probably right. If we’d kept it like that I think everyone would have headed for the beaches”.

== See also ==
- Catch it, Bin it, Kill it
- Grim Reaper (advertisement)
- Lonely Water
