= 2009 swine flu pandemic in the United Kingdom =

2009 swine flu pandemic in the UK
- Disease: Swine flu
- Pathogen: H1N1
- First outbreak: North America, possibly Central Mexico
- Arrival date: 27 April 2009 (First cases in Scotland)
- Confirmed cases: Possible 100,000+ cases (As of January 2010)
- Deaths: 392 (28 January 2010)

Government website
- Health Protection Agency (HPA)^{*} Data from Health Protection Agency

The 2009 swine flu pandemic was a global outbreak of a new strain of influenza A virus subtype H1N1, first identified in April 2009, termed Pandemic H1N1/09 virus by the World Health Organization (WHO) and colloquially called swine flu. The outbreak was first observed in Mexico, and quickly spread globally. On 11 June 2009, the WHO declared the outbreak to be a pandemic. The overwhelming majority of patients experienced mild symptoms, but some persons were in higher risk groups, such as those with asthma, diabetes, obesity, heart disease, who were pregnant or had a weakened immune system. In the rare severe cases, around 3–5 days after symptoms manifest, the sufferer's condition declines quickly, often to the point of respiratory failure.

The virus reached the United Kingdom in April 2009. The first cases were confirmed on 27 April 2009 in passengers returning from Mexico. The first case of person to person transmission within the UK was announced on 1 May 2009. In the UK, 5- to 14-year-olds were the age group predominantly affected. Laboratory tests demonstrated that older people had some immunity.

After a slow start, the virus spread rapidly in the UK in July 2009, with new cases peaking at 110,000 in the last week of that month, according to The Health Protection Agency's modelling estimate, but declining sharply in the first week of August 2009. Cases fell progressively down to 3,000 in the first week of September 2009, then began to rise again. The decline in cases during the summer had been predicted, but a large surge was expected in the autumn to coincide with the normal flu season. Cases rose to 84,000 by the end of October, well below the summer's peak, and then declined during November.

UK 2009 Swine Flu cases per week. Health Protection Agency modelling

== Outbreak timeline ==
2009	UK swine flu outbreak, milestone
27 April	First two UK H1N1 cases confirmed in Scotland after a flight from Mexico.
29 April	Paignton Community and Sports College closes for about a week in first school closure.
1 May	First two UK person to person transmissions confirmed.
2 May	Further schools are temporarily closed from this date.
7 May	HPA issues advice on exclusion from schools and workplaces.
8 May	HPA issues "advice on actions to be taken in a school in the event of a probable or confirmed case of "swine flu" being identified in a school pupil", in which closure for 7 days is advised when appropriate.
8 May	The virus from European samples isolated and its full genetic fingerprint determined by UK researchers, following similar work in the US on the virus in the American continent.
17 May	One hundredth confirmed case.
22 May	HPA staff no longer routinely meet flights from Mexico. Contact tracing of passengers deemed to be at risk of swine flu carried out on the basis of risk, as for other communicable diseases.
26 May	The largest single outbreak so far, with 50 confirmed cases identified at a Birmingham primary school (later increased to 74).
13 June	Over 1,000 cases of swine flu confirmed in the UK.
14 June	First death, of patient with underlying health problems, reported at the Royal Alexandra Hospital in Paisley, Glasgow, Scotland.
26 June	Second death, of patient with underlying health problems, of a six-year-old girl at Birmingham Children's Hospital in the West Midlands region. Her death was reported on 29 June.
30 June	6,000 cases of swine flu confirmed in the UK.
2 July	The HPA announced that the containment approach to reduce spread was no longer appropriate given the clusters of cases around the UK, and would be replaced by a treatment phase in which everybody presenting symptoms would be treated if necessary without laboratory confirmation, but contacts would not be traced. Daily reports of confirmed cases are no longer being published.
6 July	Three deaths in the UK bringing the total to seven. The new victims include two 9-year-old girls. NHS stated all three had "serious underlying health problems". The victims are from South London and Dewsbury in West Yorkshire.
9 July	The government announced that there are now over 9,000 cases of Swine flu in the UK and 14 patients have died, 2 in Scotland, 5 in London, and the remainder elsewhere in England.
10 July	A 15th person has died from swine flu in Essex. Unlike previous cases, they had no underlying health conditions.
13 July	2 more people die with swine flu in England. One, a 6-year-old girl, who died of septacemia, and a middle-aged doctor. Initial reports that he died of Pulmonary Embolism were disproved on his final Post Mortem, which concluded that Swine Flu was a contributing factor in his death.
16 July	It emerges that 12 more people have died. The total now stands at 29. 85,000 people are estimated to be affected by swine flu as of 16 July, with 55,000 new infections in the preceding week according to HPA modelling.
23 July	The National Pandemic Flu Service goes live in England for the first time. Shortly after it goes live, the Service gets over 2,000 hits per second. Scotland, Wales and Northern Ireland can opt in for the service if the rate of infection increases.
21 August	The first swine flu related death in Wales has been confirmed after a 55-year-old woman died.
15 October	Its announced that there were 27,000 new swine flu cases in the past week, up from 18,000 the week before, and new cases were rising more slowly than expected, but the number requiring treatment in intensive care had increased from 47 out of 290 hospitalised last week to 74 out of 364 hospitalised this week. The number of deaths in the UK rose to 106.
21 October	Swine Flu Vaccine became available across the UK and mass immunisation programme gets under way.
22 October	It's announced that Swine flu cases in the UK almost doubled from the previous week to 53,000. The number of patients needing hospital care has risen to 506 in England with 99 in critical care – the highest since the pandemic began. Deaths increased to 128. The total number of cases is now estimated to be 435,000.
29 October	Swine Flu cases rose by almost 50% to 78,000 new cases. Deaths increased to 137. Hospitalised patients increased to 751, of which 157 are in intensive care including nine people on ECMO (extracorporeal membrane oxygenation) machines. It is now estimated that there have been 521,000 cases in England since the pandemic began. It is also reported that one in three deaths are not in the "priority vaccination group" as currently defined by the government.
5 November	New Swine Flu cases increased to 84,000. Deaths increased to 154. 848 people are hospitalised, 172 of which are in intensive care. It is thought that the rise in new cases was smaller this week due to school children being on their "half term" holidays. Andrew Lansley, the Shadow Health Secretary, called on the Government to commit to vaccinating all schoolchildren in the country, as well as university students.
12 November	The number of new swine flu cases in the past week fell by nearly a quarter to 64,000 in England. Deaths increased to 182 (124 deaths in England, 33 in Scotland, 11 in Northern Ireland and 14 in Wales). Hospitalised patients fell to 785, of whom 173 are in intensive care. The Chief Medical Officer, Sir Liam Donaldson, said that the drop in new cases could be due to school children's half term break, the impact of which could last two weeks and that next week's figures should give a clearer picture of how the virus is developing. Shadow health secretary Andrew Lansley said the latest figures again illustrated the importance of vaccinating children. "This is further evidence that we need to begin planning a school and college-based vaccination programme immediately."
19 November	New Swine Flu cases decreased again from the previous week, down to 53,000 new cases in England in the last week. 783 patients were hospitalised. The number of deaths related to swine flu in the UK increased to 214 (142 in England). The HPA estimates that there have now been a total of 715,000 cases of swine flu since the pandemic began. The government has announced that all children under the age of five are to get the swine flu vaccine. Chief Medical Officer Sir Liam Donaldson said there had been a rise in serious illnesses recently among young children that was "causing concern". "We consider them to be seriously at risk". Latest figures showed that 81% of under-5s hospitalised with swine flu had no underlying health issues. The Conservative Party says that all under-25s should get the vaccine next.
20 November	The first officially confirmed cases of person-to-person transmission of a Tamiflu-resistant strain of swine flu in the world are reported to have happened between 5 patients at the University Hospital of Wales in Cardiff.
26 November	The number of new swine flu cases continue to fall, with 46,000 new cases in the last week, 7,000 less than the week before. However Swine flu deaths in England in a single week reached their highest level with a record 21 deaths, bringing the total deaths to 245 in the UK (163 in England). There were 753 hospitalised patients, 154 of those being in intensive care. The Government estimates more than a million people have now been vaccinated, roughly a month after the vaccination program started (that figure excludes health care workers, who are also being offered the vaccine). That means only about 1 in 10 of the 11 million people in the "at risk" priority groups have so far been vaccinated. Professor David Salisbury, head of immunisation at the Department of Health was disappointed, saying "Clearly I would have liked a bigger number...I would like to see an acceleration now".
3 December	New Swine Flu cases more than halved from the previous week, dropping to 22,000 new cases in England in the last week. Total deaths increased to 270 (178 deaths in England). There are 747 hospitalised patients – 161 of which are in critical care. A further 600,000 people were vaccinated in the last week, bringing total to 1.6 million people. In addition to that, 275,000 healthcare workers have been vaccinated out of nearly 2 million. Chief Medical Officer Sir Liam Donaldson said it was still "too early" to know whether the downward trend in new cases would continue and that his biggest worry was the virus mutating or mixing with other viruses and creating a new, more dangerous virus. Prof David Salisbury, head of immunisation at the Department of Health, said the vaccines with adjuvants, substances which boost the immune system and allow less active ingredient to be used in each dose, offer good protection even if the virus does change; "One of the advantages with adjuvanted vaccines is their ability to protect against drifted (mutated) strains. It opens the door for a whole new strategy in dealing with flu." The GlaxoSmithKline vaccine, Pandemrix, which forms the bulk of the governments mass vaccination programme with 11.2 million doses delivered so far to health services, contains an adjuvant.
10 December	New Swine Flu cases halved from the previous week, to 11,000 new cases in England. Deaths increased to 283 (191 in England) and there were currently 636 hospitalised patients. The number of people vaccinated increased to 2.3 million. The estimated total number of cases is 795,000. The Chief Medical Officer Sir Liam Donaldson revealed that the swine flu pandemic is "considerably less lethal" than feared. An analysis of deaths to 8 November showed that 26 people have died for every 100,000 cases in England, meaning a death rate of 0.026% in those infected with Swine Flu. The highest death rate was in those aged over 65, and lowest in those aged 5 to 14. The average age at death was 39. Of the patients who died, 67% were in the "high risk" vaccination priority group and were eligible to get vaccinated, 36% had either no or only mild pre-existing illnesses. Sir Liam again urged people to come forward for immunisation, commenting that a lower impact than previously feared "is not a justification for public health inaction. Our data supports the priority vaccination of high risk groups. Given that a substantial minority of deaths occur in previously healthy people, there is a case for extending the vaccination programme".
17 December	New Swine Flu cases again fell with 9000 people infected in last week. Total deaths in the UK increased to 299 (203 in England). The number of currently hospitalised patients fell to 523 patients of which more than 100 were in intensive care. 3 million people out of the 9 million in the 1st vaccination priority groups have now been vaccinated including 100,000 pregnant women. In addition to that, 343,000 front line health workers have also been vaccinated. It appears that the second wave of Swine Flu is coming to an end but experts warn cases could rise again in the future in a "third wave" of swine flu.
24 December	New cases of Swine Flu fell by a third to 6,000 cases this week. The total death figures will be updated by the HPA on Thursday 7 January. The number of hospitalised patients declined to 454 currently in hospital (as of 8 am on 23 December).
31 December	The HPA did not release estimate numbers this week, instead saying that flu activity is continuing to decrease across the UK but some caution must be exercised as this may be influenced by the holiday period. 496 patients were currently hospitalised in England as of 8 am on 30 December (an increase from last week). A more detailed update will be released next week.
8 January	Swine Flu cases continued to decrease, down to less than 5,000 new cases in the preceding week. Total UK deaths increased to 360 (251 in England, 64 in Scotland, 28 in Wales and 17 in Northern Ireland). Hospitalised patients in England (as of 8 am on 6 January) numbered 393, of whom 103 were in critical care. Only 3.2 million people had been vaccinated (out of 9 million in the priority groups), including 113,000 pregnant women (out of roughly 600,000), 86,000 under-5s (out of more than 3 million) and an additional 373,000 front-line health workers (out of more than a million). The Head of Immunisation at the Department of Health, Professor David Salisbury urged all those in the at-risk priority groups to get immunised, especially children under five and those with underlying health conditions, because while cases were currently down, it was not clear what would happen with swine flu over the year ahead.

== Reported cases ==
Until 2 July 2009 the HPA published daily reports of laboratory-confirmed cases with breakdown by region, by age, and by source of infection (travel, community, etc.). From that date routine laboratory testing of all suspected cases and reporting of figures was discontinued. As of 8 July 2009 figures shown in this article are laboratory confirmed cases reported on 2 July.

Deaths are often reported as occurring "after contracting the swine flu virus" without flu being necessarily the cause of death of people with underlying health problems.

Researchers at Imperial College London said in July 2009 that the best estimate was that about 0.5% of those who get swine flu bad enough to seek medical help die from it, a figure very similar to the estimate for seasonal influenza. The World Health Organization (WHO) said the pandemic was over in August 2010. As of 2023, it is seen as "circulating in humans seasonally," posing the same risk of other seasonal flu viruses.

=== Cases by region ===
Figures for laboratory confirmed cases in England and Scotland are as of 2 July 2009, after which routine testing was discontinued. Deaths are of people with swine flu, not necessarily caused by swine flu.
Region	Cases
Region	Laboratory confirmed^{†}	Confirmed Deaths
Totals	28,456	392
England	19,995	279
Northern Ireland	1,355	18
Scotland	6,450	67
Wales	656	28
^{†} The cumulative total number of cases, including patients who have recovered.

Laboratory-confirmed
cases of AH1N1 Influenza
in the United Kingdom
up to 2 July 2009

Health Protection Agency
update bulletins

UK weekly GP consultations for influenza-like illness. QResearch data from Health Protection Agency

=== Detailed reports ===
On 25 April 2009, a member of British Airways cabin crew was taken to Northwick Park Hospital in Harrow and quarantined after falling ill with flu-like symptoms on a flight from Mexico City though he was later found not to have swine flu.

On 26 April, two people were admitted to Monklands Hospital in Airdrie, North Lanarkshire, with mild flu-like symptoms after returning from Mexico. The next day, the Cabinet Secretary for Health and Wellbeing, Nicola Sturgeon, confirmed that these were cases of the swine influenza A (H1N1) virus. Authorities in both Scotland and England stated that there were no plans to trace the fellow airline passengers who may have travelled alongside the couple, since the authorities do not classify them as "close contacts". These cases along with one in Spain are the first confirmed cases in Europe.

At noon on 29 April the government reported three more confirmed cases in the UK, including the first cases in England. All three had recently returned from Mexico. The secondary school, Paignton Community and Sports College, closed for seven days.

By 26 May the number of people who had contracted the disease in-country increased to 125, the highest in Europe and triple the second highest, Spain.

On 28 May, sixty four people connected with a primary school in Birmingham were diagnosed with swine flu .

On 8 June the HPA issued a report stating that the majority of cases are in school age children and young adults, which has not been the case in most pandemics with the notable exception of the 1918 flu pandemic.

On 25 June the chief medical officer Sir Liam Donaldson said certain areas were seeing rapid community spread which meant that it was no longer practical to attempt in those areas (initially parts of London, the west Midlands and east Berkshire) to put a ring around the outbreaks by tracing the people with whom confirmed cases have come into contact and giving them drugs to try to prevent flu developing. In these areas, anti-viral drugs may in the future only be given to people showing symptoms, and tracing of contacts will stop. The contingency plans always envisaged the containment phase would not last indefinitely. The start of the treatment (as against containment) approach was announced on 2 July 2009.

Every year in late June and early July the Wimbledon tennis championships are held in London, attracting worldwide interest and with many hours of UK television coverage every day. On 1 July 2009 it was reported that 28 Wimbledon staff had been asked to stay at home with flu-like symptoms. Two named players are reported to have caught the virus.

A study published in the August 2009 issue of The Lancet (available on 20 July) suggests that prolonging the school holidays could reduce the spread of the virus by up to 17%. This would be disruptive, and would not reduce the overall number of infections, but could delay the spread and buy time for preparation of a vaccine. The government's advice is that schools should not be closed, but that the evidence will be reviewed in August as school summer holidays end.

== Public information ==
The Department of Health announced on 29 April 2009 that they intended to send an information leaflet on swine flu to every household in the UK. The information leaflets were distributed at the beginning of May. On 29 April, Alan Johnson announced that television and radio advice would also be broadcast starting on 30 April. The slogan "Catch it, Bin it, Kill it" was used to encourage good hand and respiratory hygiene. On 30 April 2009, a swine flu information line was launched with advice on setting up "flu friends" (this is not the National Flu Line service mentioned below).

The Department of Health Pandemic Plan (revised November 2007) states "UK health departments (directorate in Scotland) will run a national door drop and advertising campaign in Phase 5, alerting the public to the heightened risk, emphasising the need for personal preparation and socially responsible behaviour. A public information film will demonstrate how to slow the spread of the virus, and the National Flu Line service will be available. Information materials will also be available through primary care, pharmacies and on the Department of Health website." After criticism of the lateness of its launch, it was announced in late July that the National Flu Line service was to be launched on 24 July 2009.

There are government websites with general information and the latest updates on human swine flu in England, Northern Ireland, Scotland, and Wales.

The HPA website includes frequently updated advice for the public, advice on exclusion from schools and workplaces (and a document specifically for schools), and information for health professionals.

During the initial containment phase of the swine flu outbreak the HPA published detailed information in daily and weekly reports linked from its Epidemiological data page on its website. On 2 July, when the policy of containment was dropped in favour of treatment of presumed cases, the daily updates of laboratory confirmed cases were stopped. A weekly epidemiological update and pandemic flu update are published each Tuesday, with much detailed information including regional information and breakdown by age.

== Control measures ==
On 11 May 2009 UK epidemiologists at Imperial College London considered that H1N1 swine flu was spreading fast enough to justify the preparations for a pandemic. It was showing "sustained human-to-human transmission", thereby justifying the WHO's pandemic phase 5 rating. It is estimated that on average each person who contracts flu passes it on to between 1.4 and 1.6 other people, no worse than the three influenza pandemics of the twentieth century. Early analysis suggested that the spread was likely to be similar to the earlier pandemics. Up to the date of the study, clinical severity was similar to 1957 and less than 1918 flu pandemic. However, the clinical severity of the outbreak and how the virus will evolve was yet to be predicted.

=== Travel to and from affected areas ===
On 27 April, the Foreign & Commonwealth Office advised against all but essential travel to Mexico and stated that British citizens in Mexico... "may wish to consider whether they should remain in Mexico at this time". On 28 April the Mexican Tourist Board estimated that there were "a few thousand" British tourists in Mexico.

Holiday companies Thomas Cook and Airtours said that between them they had about "3,000 holidaymakers in Mexico" as of 28 April 2009. The first British tourists being brought back early from Mexico on 28 April 2009 told reporters that they had received little or no information about health precautions, either from the Mexican authorities, hotels, or from local tour guides.

A leaflet was being distributed at all ports of entry into the UK providing passengers arriving in the UK with information on swine flu.

Until 21 May HPA staff met travellers arriving from Mexico. This was discontinued on 22 May, but advice remained that travellers from affected areas who become unwell within seven days of arrival, and contacts with symptoms of a confirmed or probable case, should stay at home and contact their GP or NHS Direct. Contact tracing of passengers deemed to be at risk of swine flu will be carried out on the basis of risk, as for other communicable diseases.

=== Preparations ===
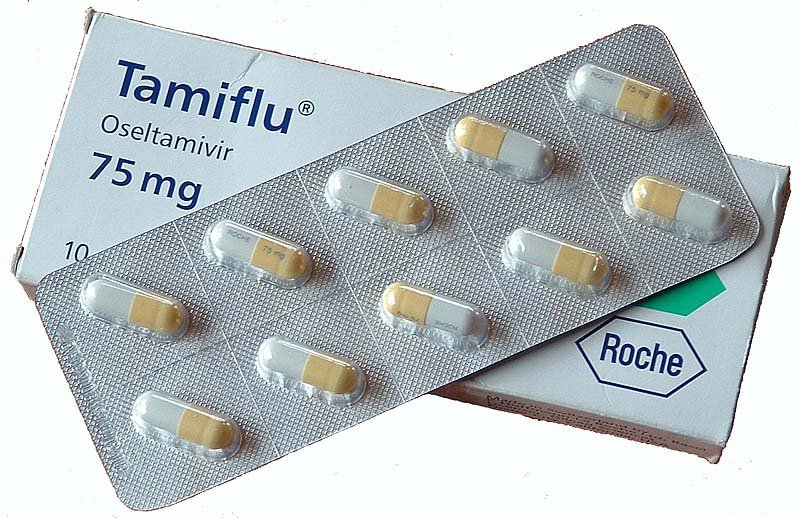
Tamiflu, influenza anti-viral drug

Information, advice, and guidance both general and for specific cases (schools, workplaces) is being made available and updated by the HPA (see Public information campaign section above).

As of 13 June 2009 the government estimated that the UK has enough anti-viral drugs for 50% of the population but has plans to raise that figure to 80%.

There is a pandemic plan covering topics from distributing the drugs and setting up helplines to closing schools and banning public events which was tested in a large exercise in 2007. There is also a specific response plan for London. Oseltamivir (Tamiflu) and zanamivir (Relenza), the two anti-virals known to be effective, must be taken within 48 hours of onset of symptoms or earlier to be effective; the positive effects are greatest if treatment is started within six hours.

The HPA reported in its 24 June 2009 weekly epidemiological report that all 17 samples of the virus laboratory tested for resistance that week were found to be sensitive to oseltamivir and zanamivir, but resistant to amantadine. The first case of resistance of the virus to oseltamivir, in Denmark, was reported on 29 June 2009.

On 5 May 2009 plans were announced for pupils unable to sit examinations at schools affected by flu to be assessed in other ways to ensure that children are not disadvantaged.

The Department of Health has listed all the pandemic flu guidance that it had published as of 8 June 2008.

=== Testing suspected cases ===
==== Genetic analysis ====
Samples from suspected cases have been analysed by the National Institute for Medical Research in London, which is also examining samples of the U.S. strain of the disease.

By 8 May 2009 the US Centers for Disease Control and Prevention had made genetic information on the swine flu virus available, and the virus from European samples had been isolated and its full genetic fingerprint determined by UK researchers. The genetics and effects of the virus in general are discussed in the article on the 2009 swine flu pandemic.

==== Diagnosis ====
The fastest way for laboratory confirmation of swine flu is by the PCR method, described as a real-time method. According to the World Health Organization there are four laboratories in the UK able to perform PCR to diagnose influenza A (H1N1) virus infection in humans: Regional Virus Laboratory, Royal Victoria Hospital, Belfast, NI; Regional Virus Laboratory, Gartnavel General Hospital, Glasgow, Scotland; Health Protection Agency, Centre for Infections, Enteric, Respiratory, & Neurological Virus Laboratory, London; WHO Collaborating Centre for Reference and Research on Influenza, National Institute for Medical Research, London.

Another laboratory confirmation is a fourfold increase in virus-specific antibodies 10 to 14 days later.

From 2 July 2009 when a treatment, rather than containment, approach was adopted, the official clinical diagnostic criteria became: "fever (pyrexia ≥38 °C) or a history of fever, and also influenza-like illness (two or more of the following symptoms: cough; sore throat; rhinorrhoea; limb or joint pain; headache; vomiting or diarrhoea) or severe and/or life-threatening illness suggestive of an infectious process".

"Laboratory confirmed" cases

In the USA mathematical modelling based on surveys estimated that there were about 1 million cases of H1N1 flu on 25 June 2009, compared to 28,000 reported officially. Such a study has not been carried out in the UK.

As of 2 July 2009 GPs will diagnose based on clinical observation and routine swabbing will stop, and the HPA will "no longer be providing a daily update of the numbers of cases confirmed through laboratory tests"

=== Hygiene recommendations ===
According to the Health Protection Agency's "Swine flu: frequently asked questions" web page, transmission of this new virus is thought to occur in the same way as seasonal flu:

- large droplets from coughing and/or sneezing by an infected person within a short distance (usually 1 metre or less) of someone;
- touching or shaking the hand of an infected person, and then touching your eyes, nose or mouth without first washing your hands;
- touching surfaces or objects (e.g. door handles) that have become contaminated with the flu virus, and then touching your eyes, nose or mouth without first washing your hands.

When the issue of touching your eyes, nose or mouth is combined with other infection control practices and good hygiene measures as recommended by the Health Protection Agency's website, the following recommendations emerge as important ways to help reduce the spread of swine flu and other viruses:

- Don't touch your eyes, nose or mouth without first washing your hands.
- Cover your nose and mouth when coughing or sneezing, and use a tissue when possible.
- Dispose of dirty tissues promptly and carefully.
- Maintain good basic hygiene, for example washing hands frequently with soap and water to reduce the spread of the virus from your hands to your face, or to other people.
- Clean hard surfaces, such as door handles, frequently using a normal cleaning product.
- Make sure children follow this advice.
- Anyone with swine flu or being investigated as a possible case will be given anti-virals and asked to stay at home and limit their contact with other people.
- Where anti-virals are prescribed the course of treatment must be followed and completed, although it may sometimes cause nausea.

For people belonging to a high-risk group it is particularly important that they start taking anti-virals as soon as possible after infection. High-risk groups include people with long-term conditions, those over 65, children under five and pregnant women.

=== Immunity ===
A study at the U.S. Centers for Disease Control and Prevention published in May 2009 found that children had no pre-existing immunity to the new strain but that adults, particularly those over 60, had some degree of immunity. Children showed no cross-reactive antibody reaction to the new strain, adults aged 18 to 64 had 6–9%, and older adults 33%. The large proportion of cases in the UK affecting children and young adults is consistent with this pattern of resistance.

=== Vaccine ===
The usual seasonal flu vaccines gave little or no immunity against the new strain of flu. There was an international program to produce a vaccine which would be effective against the new H1N1 strain. The chief medical officer Sir Liam Donaldson said on 25 June that it seemed likely that the UK would receive the first batches of vaccines slightly earlier than expected, possibly from August rather than the autumn as first expected, although some industry sources do not expect supplies to be available so soon. The government had contracts for 132 million doses. There were risks involved in shifting resources to the new vaccine: it would not be possible to produce the seasonal flu vaccine, and it was possible that the virus will mutate to make a vaccine developed before the mutation ineffective.

=== Possible use of face-masks ===
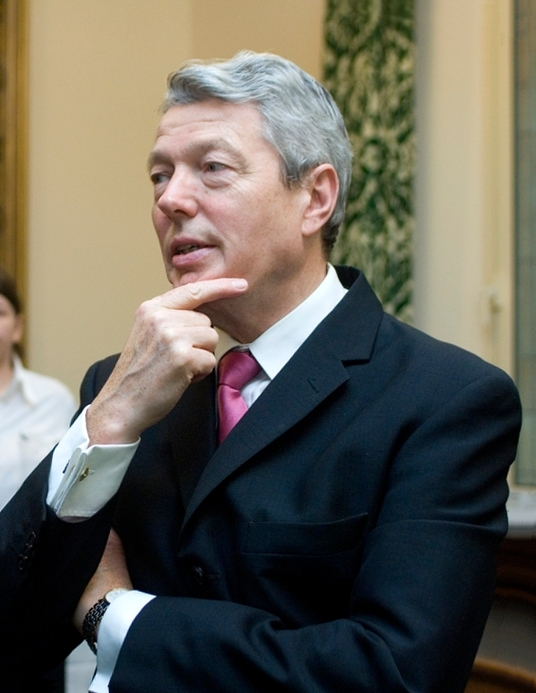
Alan Johnson, Health Secretary at the time of the outbreak

The then Health Secretary Alan Johnson told MPs on 27 April that "Although we are aware that face-masks are being given out to the public in Mexico, the available scientific evidence does not support the general wearing of face-masks by those who are not ill, whilst going about their normal activities."

Professor Steve Field, chairman of the Royal College of General Practitioners, said people in the UK were "perfectly safe at the moment", and did not need to start wearing face-masks or stop eating pork.

The Head of Pandemic Planning at the Royal College of General Practitioners, Dr Maureen Baker, stated on 27 April that "Masks become ineffective when they become damp or after a few hours. There has been a lot of debate on the use of face-masks and some authorities say that, in the community, the most effective use is to give to patients who may have symptoms when they present in the surgery – that should help reduce the infectivity of that patient to surgery staff and other patients. I expect the Department of Health will issue guidance on use of face-masks if we move into a pandemic phase." Masks may not protect the wearer from inhalation of the virus, but might protect other people from picking up the virus from the wearer.

Professor John Oxford, a virologist at leading London hospital, The Barts and the London, said: "Really, there is very little evidence that masks actually offer much protection against flu."

It was reported that the UK government was urgently seeking to acquire more face-masks.

The advice given by authorities in several countries on the use of face masks has been summarised in an article, with many references, published on 4 June 2009.

Aside from their obligations under health and safety legislation, employers can help to minimise the spread of the virus and support good infection control practice by positively encouraging any employee who reports feeling unwell with influenza-like symptoms to stay at home until their symptoms resolve, by sending people home who develop influenza-like illness at work (avoiding public transport and wearing a face mask if possible) and by ensuring that stocks of surgical face-masks are available in the workplace for symptomatic staff to wear until they get home.

— DoH Pandemic Flu Plan, November 2007

== See also ==
- GISAID the Global Initiative on Sharing Avian Influenza Data (also covers novel A/H1N1 swine flu)
