= Swine Flu Skank =

2009 song by Jstar and Pilot

"Swine Flu Skank" is a viral UK funky comedy song by British MCs Jstar and Pilot, released during the swine flu pandemic of 2009–2010 and utilising the Department of Health and Social Care's 'catch it, bin it, kill it' campaign slogan, encouraging the public to prevent the flu's spread. It received more than 10,000 views within three hours of its release, and has since accumulated over a million YouTube views.
