= Umifenovir =

Chemical compound

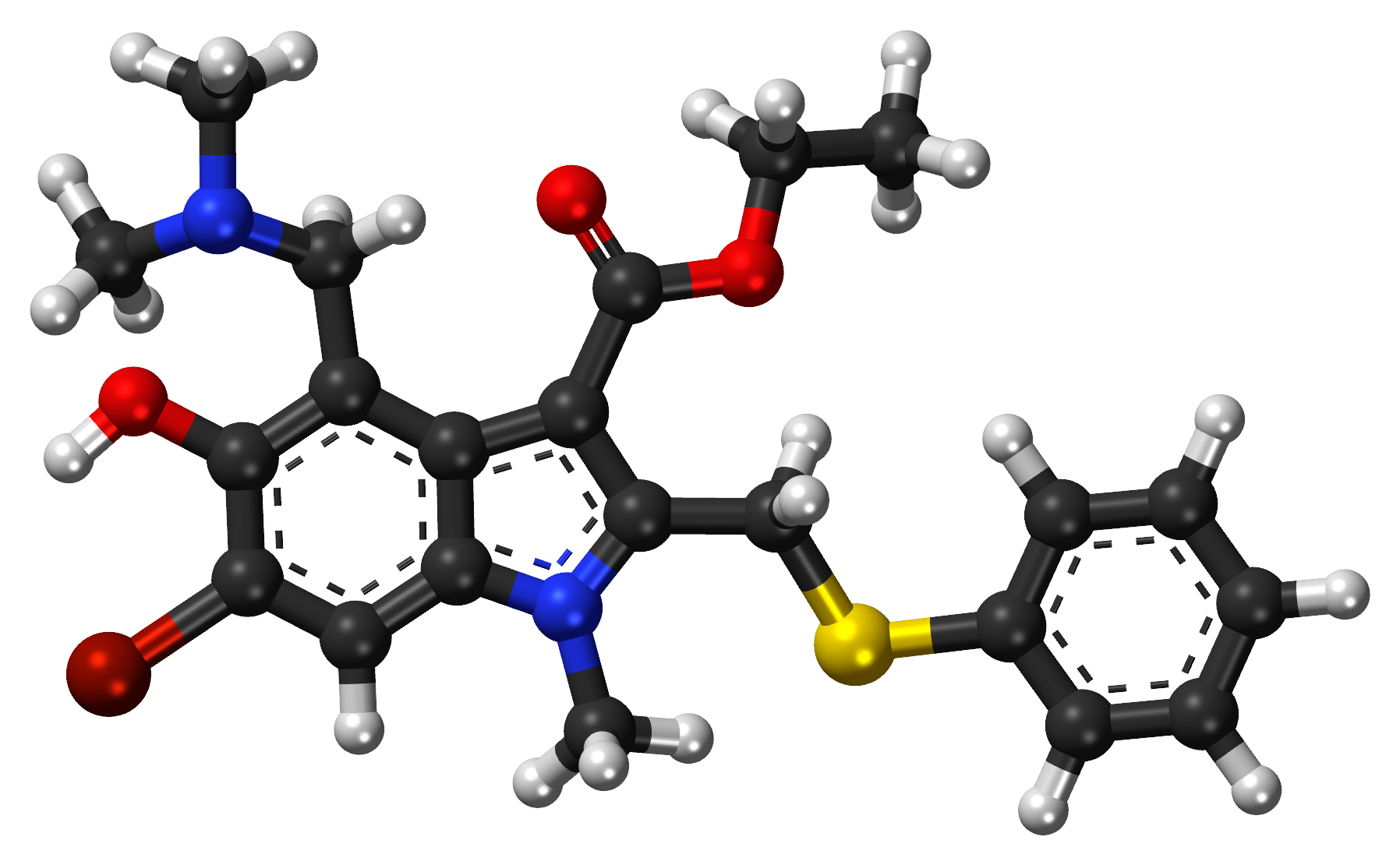

Clinical data
- Trade names: Arbidol
- Other names: AR-1I9514, Russian: Арбидол, Chinese: 阿比朵尔.
- Routes of administration: By mouth (hard capsules, tablets)
- ATC code: J05AX13 (WHO)

Legal status
- Legal status: RU: OTC CN: Rx-only BY: OTC

Pharmacokinetic data
- Bioavailability: 40%
- Metabolism: Liver, CYP3A4
- Elimination half-life: 17–21 hours
- Excretion: 40% excrete as unchanged umifenovir in feces (38.9%) and urine (0.12%)

Identifiers
- IUPAC name: ethyl 6-bromo-4-[(dimethylamino)methyl]-5-hydroxy-1-methyl-2-[(phenylsulfanyl)methyl]-1H-indole-3-carboxylate
- CAS Number: 131707-25-0
- PubChem CID: 131411
- DrugBank: DB13609
- ChemSpider: 116151
- UNII: 93M09WW4RU
- KEGG: D10558
- ChEBI: CHEBI:134730
- ChEMBL: ChEMBL1214598
- PDB ligand: 75U (PDBe, RCSB PDB)
- CompTox Dashboard (EPA): DTXSID60895015
- ECHA InfoCard: 100.247.800

Chemical and physical data
- Formula: C_{22}H_{25}BrN_{2}O_{3}S
- Molar mass: 477.42 g·mol^{−1}
- 3D model (JSmol): Interactive image
- SMILES: CCOC(=O)c1c(n(c2c1c(c(c(c2)Br)O)CN(C)C)C)CSc3ccccc3
- InChI: InChI=1S/C22H25BrN2O3S/c1-5-28-22(27)20-18(13-29-14-9-7-6-8-10-14)25(4)17-11-16(23)21(26)15(19(17)20)12-24(2)3/h6-11,26H,5,12-13H2,1-4H3; Key:KCFYEAOKVJSACF-UHFFFAOYSA-N

Umifenovir, sold under the brand name Arbidol, is sold and used as an antiviral medication for influenza in Russia and China. The drug is manufactured by Pharmstandard (Russian: Фармстандарт).

== Medical use ==
Testing of umifenovir's efficacy has mainly occurred in China and Russia, and it is well known in these two countries. Some of the Russian tests showed the drug to be effective against influenza A and a direct comparison with oseltamivir showed similar efficiency in vitro and in a clinical setting. In 2010 Arbidol was the drug brand with the highest sales volume in Russia. In the first quarter of 2020 it had a 16 percent share in the Russian antiviral market.

Umifenovir is used primarily as an antiviral treatment for influenza. The drug has also been investigated as a candidate drug for treatment of hepatitis C.

Some preliminary research suggests it could be useful for flavivirus infection like West Nile virus.

Some studies also indicate that umifenovir also has in vitro effectiveness at preventing entry of Zaire ebolavirus (Kikwit strain), Tacaribe arenavirus and Kaposi's sarcoma-associated herpesvirus in mammalian cell cultures, while confirming umifenovir's suppressive effect in vitro on Hepatitis B and poliovirus infection of mammalian cells when introduced either in advance of viral infection or during infection.

== Side effects ==
Side effects in children include sensitization to the drug. No known overdose cases have been reported and allergic reactions are limited to people with hypersensitivity. The LD_{50} is more than 4 g/kg.

== Pharmacology ==
=== Pharmacodynamics ===
Umifenovir inhibits membrane fusion of influenza virus in vitro. Fusion between the viral envelope (surrounding the viral capsid) and the cell membrane of the target cell is inhibited. This prevents viral entry to the target cell, and therefore protects it from infection.

Some evidence suggests that the drug's actions are more effective at preventing infections from RNA viruses than infections from DNA viruses.

As well as specific antiviral action against both influenza A and influenza B viruses, umifenovir exhibits modulatory effects on the immune system. The drug stimulates a humoral immune response, induces interferon-production, and stimulates the phagocytic function of macrophages.

=== Pharmacokinetics ===
The maximum concentration of umifenovir in blood plasma when taking a dose of 50 mg is achieved after 1.2 hours, with 100 mg the maximum dose is obtained after 1.5 hours. The bioavailability of the drug is about 40% and does not depend on food intake.

The half-life is about 17-21 hours. It is metabolized in the liver primarily by CYP3A4 but also by several other enzymes. About 40% is excreted unchanged, mainly in bile (38.9%) and in small amounts by the kidneys (0.12%). During the first 24 hours, 90% of the administered dose is eliminated.

== Chemistry ==
Chemically, umifenovir features an indole core, functionalized at all but one positions with different substituents. The molecular groups of umifenovir - hydroxy, amino and carboxy - can form different hydrogen-bonded synthons. Umifenovir is characterized by only one polymorphic form but can exist in the form of a large number of crystal solvates, the production of which depends on the medium and conditions of synthesis. Umifenovir is poorly soluble in water. Crystalline solvates and other solid forms may be determined by the spatial structure and conformational equilibria in the saturated solution.

== History and criticism ==
A Russian packet of Arbidol capsules

In 2006 the American company Good Earth Medicine applied to the FDA for an Emergency Use Authorization of Arbidol during the H5N1 bird flu epidemic, but their application was rejected on the grounds that the lab data provided was not strong enough to justify use.

In 2007, the Russian Academy of Medical Sciences stated that the effects of Arbidol (umifenovir) are not scientifically proven.

In the early 2010s Russian media criticized lobbying attempts by Tatyana Golikova (then-Minister of Healthcare) to promote umifenovir, and the unsubstantiated claim that Arbidol can speed up recovery from flu or cold by 1.3-2.3 days. They also made claims that comparative clinical studies have proven umifenovir to be inefficient.

In January 2020, the Russian drug company OTCPharm (Отисифарм) published advertisements stating that the drug is effective against SARS-CoV-2. Shortly afterwards the Russian Federal Antimonopoly Service fined the company for violation of its advertising rules. In March 2020 a video promoting the drug for COVID-19 went viral on Facebook and circulated heavily on WhatsApp, and around the same time a shortage of the drug ensued in Russia.

== Research for COVID-19 ==
In early 2020 umifenovir was touted as a potential treatment for COVID-19 in China, where it was sometimes given to patients in combination with other drugs such as the anti-HIV drug Darunavir. A three-arm RCT study published in May 2020 in the Cell Press journal Clinical Advances found that neither Umifenovir or Lopinavir/Ritonavir helped patients with mild to moderate COVID-19. A similar study comparing Umifenovir directly with Lopinavir/Ritonavir found no difference in fever duration between the two groups but found a lower viral load on day 14 in the Umifenovir group. A systemic review and meta-analysis of 16 studies on Umifenovir published in March 2021 concluded that there is "no significant benefit of using Arbidol compared with non‐antiviral treatment or other therapeutic agents against COVID‐19 disease."
