= Sally Bloomfield (physician) =

British academic

Sally Bloomfield is a professor at the London School of Hygiene and Tropical Medicine, London, UK. She is an expert on home hygiene research and education and has disputed the notion that we have become "too clean for our own good" and that allergies arise as a result of our "modern obsession with cleanliness". She has developed strategies for dealing with emerging infectious diseases including SARS and Ebola, and recognizes hygiene as the first step during the early stage before methods such as vaccination become available. During the COVID-19 pandemic, she endorsed the "Catch It, Bin It, Kill It" slogan, reminding people to catch a cough or sneeze in a tissue, bin the tissue immediately and then thoroughly wash hands, to prevent the spread of COVID-19.
