= Vitamin D and respiratory tract infections =

Associations have been shown between vitamin D levels and several respiratory tract infections suggesting that vitamin D deficiency may predispose to infection. Outbreaks of respiratory infections occur predominantly during months associated with lower exposure to the sun. While Institute of Medicine concluded in a 2011 report that the existing data were "not consistently supportive of a causal role" for vitamin D in reducing the risk of infection, other reviews suggest that vitamin D supplementation can provide a protective role in reducing the incidence or severity of respiratory infections.

Beneficial effects of supplemental vitamin D for patients with COPD have also been shown.

== Ultraviolet radiation and vitamin D ==
An inverse association between exposure to the sun and upper respiratory tract infections was first proposed in 1926 by Smiley, who theorized that seasonality of infection was caused by "disordered vitamine metabolism in the human...directly due to a lack of solar radiation during the dark months of winter." Studies of Dutch and Russian subjects have also indicated a correlation of ultraviolet light exposure and relative absence of infection. However, the seasonality of infections such as influenza may also be explicable by other factors. For example, low absolute humidity favours the survival of the influenza virus. A review by authors from the University of Maryland School of Pharmacy suggested that while low-dose vitamin D supplementation was unlikely to be harmful, "sensible sun exposure" was "an inexpensive and enjoyable way" to ensure healthy levels of vitamin D.

== Evidence ==
Evidence both for and against an association of vitamin D and respiratory infections has been reported. Early studies of vitamin D and mice came to different conclusions, with one group reporting a link and the other no link between deficiency and infection. More recent studies of humans have also had divergent results. People with the lowest blood vitamin D levels reported having significantly more recent colds or cases of the flu chronic respiratory disorders, especially those who had pre-existing respiratory ailments Children who took vitamin D_{3} supplements daily in winter were 42% less likely to get infected with seasonal flu than those who were given a placebo. Mongolian schoolchildren who drank vitamin D fortified milk during winter reported having fewer colds than those who received non-fortified milk. Another study found no effect of vitamin D supplementation on the incidence or severity of upper respiratory tract infections. Authors of one of the positive studies also stressed that their results would need to be confirmed in clinical trials before vitamin D could be recommended to prevent infections.

The Institute of Medicine released a comprehensive, peer-reviewed report on calcium and vitamin D in 2011. The conclusion of the report was that the existing studies did not provide strong or consistent evidence for a link between vitamin D deficiency and respiratory tract infections. The authors stated that data from randomised controlled trials would be needed, showing a dose response to vitamin D supplementation, before recommendations could be considered. In contrast, a more recent meta-analysis concluded "Vitamin D supplementation was safe and it protected against acute respiratory tract infection overall. Patients who were very vitamin D deficient and those not receiving bolus doses experienced the most benefit."

Low serum levels of vitamin D appear to be a risk factor for tuberculosis. However, supplementation trials showed no benefit. Vitamin D supplementation does not help prevent asthma attacks or alleviate symptoms.

== Vitamin D supplementation ==
Proponents of the vitamin D hypothesis have recommended dietary supplements (5,000 International Units (IU)/day for adults and 1,000 IU/day for every 25 pounds of body weight in children) and suggested that larger doses (2,000 IU/kg/day for 3–4 days) could be used to treat influenza. It has been noted that large doses of vitamin D can lead to hypercalcemia and that "single megadoses" of vitamin D, while not especially harmful, may be associated with an increased risk of bone fractures.
