= Polymerase basic protein 2 =

Identifiers
- Organism: Influenza A virus
- Symbol: PB2
- Entrez: 956536
- PDB: 2VQZ
- RefSeq (Prot): NP_040987.1
- UniProt: P21428

Other data
- Chromosome: Genome: 0 - 0 Mb
Search for
- Structures: Swiss-model
- Domains: InterPro

Influenza virus polymerase basic protein 2 (PB2) is a core subunit of the viral RNA-dependent RNA polymerase complex that is essential for both transcription and replication of the negative-strand RNA genome. PB2 binds capped host pre-mRNAs and participates in the “cap snatching” process that generates primers for viral mRNA synthesis. PB2 also acts as a key determinant of host range and pathogenicity in different influenza A strains, including through amino-acid substitutions such as the lysine at position 627. In addition, PB2 is imported into the mitochondrial matrix, where it may influence viral replication and host–virus interactions.
