= Cap snatching =

Step in viral RNA transcription

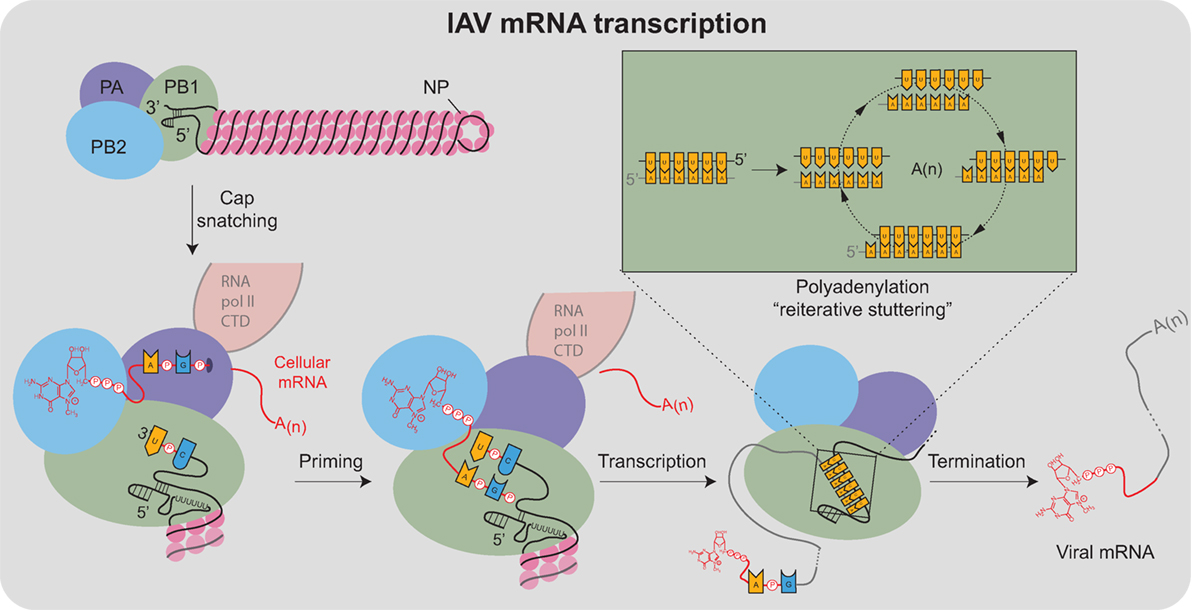
Transcription of mRNAs initiated by viral polymerase using cap snatching

The first step of transcription for some negative, single-stranded RNA viruses is cap snatching, in which the first 10 to 20 residues of a host cell RNA are removed (snatched) and used as the 5′ cap and primer to initiate the synthesis of the nascent viral mRNA. The viral RNA-dependent RNA polymerase (RdRp) can then proceed to transcribe positive-sense viral mRNA using the negative-sense viral RNA as a template. Cap-snatching also explains why some viral mRNA have 5' terminal extensions of 10-20 nucleotides that are not encoded for in the genome. Examples of viruses that engage in cap-snatching include influenza viruses (Orthomyxoviridae), Lassa virus (Arenaviridae), hantaan virus (Hantaviridae) and rift valley fever virus (Phenuiviridae). Most viruses snatch 15-20 nucleotides except for the families Arenaviridae and Nairoviridae and the genus Thogotovirus (Orthomyxoviridae) which use a shorter strand.

In the influenza virus, cap snatching occurs in the nucleus of the cell. The cap snatching endonuclease function is contained in the PA subunit of the RNA polymerase.

In Arenaviridae and Bunyavirales, cap-snatching takes place in the cytoplasm.

== Steps of cap snatching ==
Cap-snatching occurs in three general steps:

1) The viral RdRp or N protein binds to the host mRNA 5'-methylated cap-1 or cap-2 structure.

2) Viral endonuclease cleaves mRNA several nucleotides downstream of the cap.

3) Capped RNA utilized as a primer to initiate viral mRNA synthesis carried out by the RdRp.

== Cap snatching and transcription in influenza ==
Cap snatching is best described in influenza viruses, especially influenza A. In Orthomyxoviridae, the viral family of influenza, the RdRp is divided into three subunits: PA, PB1 and PB2.

PB1 first binds the 5' end of the viral RNA (vRNA), activating PB2 and causing the 3' end of the vRNA to form a double-stranded zone with the 5' end. The PB2 proceeds to bind cellular mRNA at the N7-methyl guanosine (m^{7}G) capped 5' end. The PA subunit subsequently cleaves the sequence 10-13 nucleotides from the cap structure via endonuclease activity at the N terminus. The exact cleavage location is dependent both on the distance between the PB2 and the PA of the RdRp (around 50 angstroms or 10-13 nucleotides) and also the sequence of the mRNA. Then, the PB1 subunit, which contains the polymerase activity, initially adds on two new nucleotides. The cap snatched primer moves through the product exit tunnel in the PB1 domain to serve as the primer for transcription. The vRNA 3'-UCGUUUU nucleotides are not bound to the polymerase but rather are free for complementary binding with the capped RNA primer to confer stability. Transcription then begins with G or C residue on the 3' end of the capped primer. Finally, the PB1 subunit completes chain elongation in the canonical 5' to 3' direction, releasing the cap, but keeping the 5' end bound. The viral 3' poly-A tail is added at the end of transcription by polymerase stuttering from the steric hindrance of the vRNA loop. The resulting viral mRNA looks is identical to host mRNA, allowing endogenous cellular machinery to carry out processing and nuclear export.

The de-capped host mRNAs are targeted degradation, which lead to the downregulation of cellular mRNA. Influenza RdRp also interacts with the cell Polymerase II (Pol II) C terminal domain, which potentially promotes viral transcription by changing the conformation of the RdRp. Additionally, by reducing Pol II abundance, influenza can begin to shut off critical host transcription.

Cap snatching is not used during replication. Instead, the RdRp performs a "prime and realign" step ensure that the genome is fully copied. In this mechanism, the RdRp sets down a primer internally, then the vRNA is realigned to continue replication.

Influenza's PB2 cap-binding domain has a unique fold, but it uses aromatic stacking to execute m^{7}G cap-binding similar to other cap-binding proteins. PA is a member of the PD(D/E)XK nuclease family, which uses divalent metal ions to cleave nucleic acid. However, it has a peculiar active site histidine residue which ligates the Mn2+ ion used for cleavage.

== Influenza drug therapy ==
In October 2018, the United States FDA approved baloxavir marboxil for treatment of acute uncomplicated influenza, marking the first new influenza anti-viral drug class in over two decades. The drug utilizes knowledge about cap snatching by targeting and inhibiting the endonuclease function of the PA subunit, which will prevent the virus from initiating transcription. Baloxavir marboxil (Xofluza) is effective against both influenza A and B.

== Cap snatching in Arenaviridae and Bunyavirales ==
The family Arenaviridae and order Bunyavirales are also segmented negative, single-stranded RNA viruses. A verified Mn^{2+} dependent endonuclease is located at the N-terminus of the L protein. TN-terminal domain is conserved between various families, suggesting evolutionary similarity. However, the cap-binding domain is not confirmed for every virus family, but it is believed to be located in the L or nucleocapsid (N or NP) protein.[1] In the bunyavirales, endonuclease cleavage and nucleotide motif preferences vary between families, genera and species. This variation occurs because of a need to some base pairing with the 3' end of the viral genome.

The nucleoprotein structure in Lassa virus (Arenaviridae) contains a second nuclease. Researchers propose that it is involved in attenuating interferon response, but it also contains a dTTP-binding site which may be used for cap-snatching. In this model, the L and N proteins cooperate in the cap-snatching process. The two-domain model has also been prosed for hantaviruses, but the N protein in the rift valley fever virus (Phenuiviridae) does not possess the same features.

=== Cap snatching in Hantaviridae ===
Cap snatching has also been investigated in depth for the family Hantaviridae (Bunyavirales). There is evidence that the N protein binds to the 5' cap and protects them from degradation by cellular machinery. The N protein accumulates in cytoplasmic cellular processing bodies (P bodies), sequestering the protected 5' caps as a pool of available primers for the RdRp to begin viral mRNA synthesis. There are four nucleotides on the vRNA that are adjacent the 5' cap for binding. The virus preferentially cleaves mRNA cap at a G residue 14 nucleotides downstream from the cap. Additionally, it usually cleaves caps from nonsense mRNA instead of actively translated mRNA. The N protein can guard host mRNA caps without P-bodies, but they are not used as efficiently by the RdRp.

The Hantaviridae RdRp can also engage in a "prime and realign" mechanism: The host oligonucleotide primes mRNA transcription and initiates transcription with a terminal G residue. After several nucleotides are added, the nascent RNA realigns by moving two nucleotides backwards on the repeated terminal sequence (AUCAUCAUC) so that the host G is once again the first nucleotide, creating a 5' end extension.
