= Borylation =

Catalyzed organic reactions that produce an organoboron compound

In organic chemistry, metal-catalyzed C–H borylation reactions constitute a family of organic reactions in which a transition metal catalyst activates aliphatic or aromatic C–H bonds to produce an organoboron compound (i.e., a C–B bond). They are thus functionalization reactions and a form of carbon–hydrogen bond activation. Compared to traditional polar reactions that introduce boron into a molecule, they obviate preparatory functionalization, eschew toxic byproducts, and (in some cases) functionalize a different part of the same substrate.

The net reaction for a borylation is generally a single displacement of the form

R_{2}B−BR_{2} + R'H → R_{2}BH + R'BR_{2}

The R_{2}B−BR_{2} structure is rather unusual, but known in bis(pinacolato)diboron (B_{2}Pin_{2}), bis(catecholato)diborane (B_{2}Cat_{2}), diboron tetrachloride, and tetrahydroxydiboron.

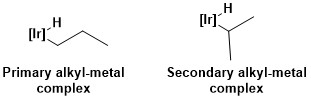
Primary versus secondary metal-alkyl complex

Mechanistically, the reaction resembles a noble-metal-catalyzed coupling reaction, and proceeds through cycles of oxidative addition followed by reductive elimination. First, the catalyst inserts into the boron-boron bond, forming a diboryl complex before eliminating one hydroboronic acid equivalent. Then it inserts into a carbon-hydrogen bond, forming a heteroleptic hydride-boryl-alkyl complex, before eliminating the product.

== Aliphatic borylation ==
As Hartwig first described in 2000, alkanes can be highly-selectively borylated at the primary C–H bond using catalytic Cp*Rh(η^{4}-C_{6}Me_{6}). Notably, the catalyst completely ignores heteroatoms, instead borylating exclusively primary C–H bonds. For acetals, ethers, amines, and alkyl fluorides with multiple primary C–H bonds, borylation occurs at the most sterically clear and electron-poorest such bond.

Aliphatic C–H borylation

C–H borylation of polyolefins

The rhodium complex catalyzes no reaction when the substrate lacks primary C–H bonds, for example cyclohexane. Ir(Mes)(BPin)_{3} or (Ir(cod)OMe)_{2} catalyze borylation selectively at secondary C–H bonds in the presence of tertiaries.

The catalysts' selectivities arise from both thermodynamic and kinetic effects. The relative steric clearance around less-substituted C–H bonds enables preferential attack by the relatively bulky catalysts. Typically, the bonds are also slightly more acidic, stabilizing the resulting complex. In the next step, primary alkyl ligands reductively eliminate with a boryl ligand more easily than do secondary ligands:

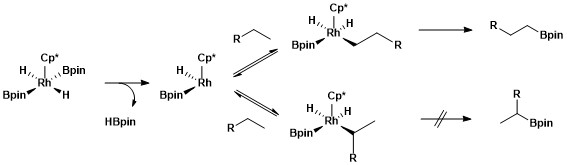
Mechanistic pathways for aliphatic C–H borylation

Catalysis with iron or tungsten carbonyl complexes is also possible, but requires irradiation to dissociate carbonyl ligands during the catalytic cycle.

== Aromatic borylation ==
Aryl borylation is more complicated than its aliphatic counterpart, as the different locations are less different sterically. In some cases, electronic effects dominate.

In the simplest case, a catalyst generated in situ from [Ir(COD)(OMe)]_{2} and 4,4′-di-tert-butylbipyridine (dtbpy) catalyzes borylation with an ortho:meta:para ratio of roughly 0:2:1 on a wide variety of substrates:

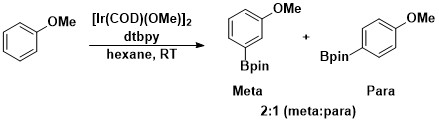
Meta-para borylation

Steric-directing iridium-catalyzed C–H borylation

A benzylic hydrosilyl group directs ortho substitution instead. The catalyst preferentially but reversibly attacks the hydrosilyl bond, holding it at the right geometry to then borylate the ortho position:

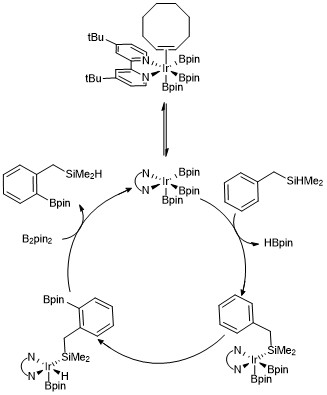
Mechanism of hydrosilane

Traditional directed ortho substitution relies on chelation to a nearby Lewis basic moiety, and cannot be achieved when bidentate dtbpy is part of the active catalyst. Contrariwise, it occurs when certain monodentate ligands, including tris(3,5-bis(trifluoromethyl)phenyl)phosphine and an immobilized phosphine, replace dtbpy. Likewise, it occurs when certain bidentate-but-hemilabile ligands, including dibenzyl pyridinal hydrazone and 8‑aminoquinoline, replace dtbpy.

Increasing the meta product proportion is also possible through chelation. The BPin moieties on the active catalyst are Lewis acidic, and coordinate to (e.g.) benzaldimines. Similarly, an appropriately chosen bipyridine-urea ligand can hydrogen bond to a benzoyl oxygen to achieve meta selectivity.

Heteroarene borylation is much more sensitive to electronic effects; furans, pyrroles, and thiophenes undergo reaction at the C–H bond adjacent to the heteroatom. The selectivity is suggested to occur because the cloven bond is the most acidic and therefore most reactive.

=== History ===
The first example of a catalytic C–H borylation of an unactivated hydrocarbon (benzene) was reported by Smith and Iverson using Ir(Cp*)(H)(Bpin) as the catalyst. The efficiency of this system, however, was low, providing only 3 turnovers after 120 h at 150 °C. Numerous subsequent developments by Hartwig and coworkers led to efficient, practical conditions for arene borylation.

Aromatic C–H functionalization was successfully incorporated in the total synthesis of Complanadine A, a Lycopodium alkaloid that enhances mRNA expression for nerve growth factor (NGF) and the production of NGF in human glial cells. Natural products that promote the growth of new neural networks are of interest in the treatment of diseases such as Alzheimer's disease. Complanadine A was successfully synthesized using a combination of direct aromatic C–H borylation developed by Hartwig and Ishyiama, followed by Suzuki–Miyaura cross coupling, then cleavage of the Boc protecting group.

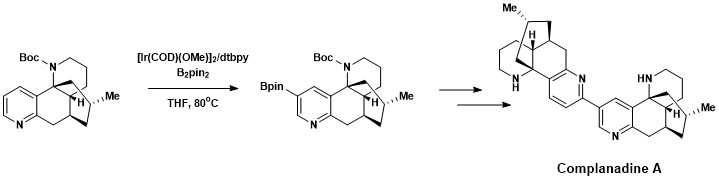
Synthesis of complanadine A

== See also ==
- Organoboron chemistry
- Boryl radicals
