= Doravirine/islatravir =

Combo medication

Combination of
- Doravirine: Non-nucleoside reverse transcriptase inhibitor
- Islatravir: Nucleoside analog reverse transcriptase inhibitor

Clinical data
- Trade names: Idvynso
- AHFS/Drugs.com: Monograph
- MedlinePlus: a626064
- License data: US DailyMed: Doravirine islatravir
- Routes of administration: By mouth
- ATC code: None

Legal status
- Legal status: CA: ℞-only; US: ℞-only

Identifiers
- KEGG: D13246

Doravirine/islatravir, sold under the brand name Idvynso, is fixed-dose combination medication used for the treatment of HIV/AIDS. It contains, doravirine, a HIV-1 non-nucleoside reverse transcriptase inhibitor; and islatravir, a nucleoside analog reverse transcriptase inhibitor. It is taken by mouth.

== Medical uses ==
Doravirine/islatravir is indicated as a complete regimen for the treatment of HIV-1 infection in adults to replace the current antiretroviral regimen in those who are virologically-suppressed (HIV-1 RNA less than 50 copies per mL) on a stable antiretroviral regimen with no history of virologic treatment failure and no known substitutions associated with resistance to doravirine.

== Society and culture ==
=== Legal status ===
The combination doravirine/islatravir was approved for medical use in the United States in April 2026.

=== Names ===
The combination doravirine/islatravir is sold under the brand name Idvynso.
