= EFDA =

EFDA may refer to:

- European Fusion Development Agreement
- EFDA Nations Cup, an automobile racing competition between 1990 and 1998 by the European Formula Drivers Association
- 4′-ethynyl-2-fluoro-2′-deoxyadenosine (EFdA), a nucleoside analog that potently inhibits HIV replication
