= Boryl radicals =

Radicals centered on boron atoms

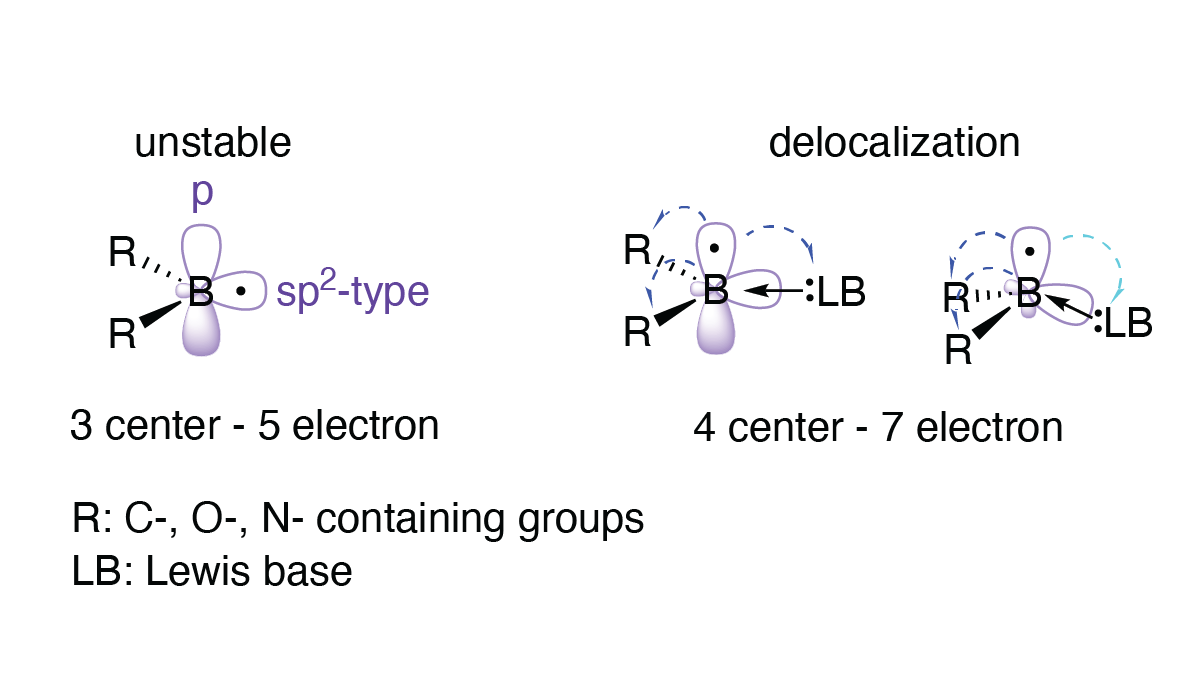
Stabilizing interactions of 4 center 7 electron radicals

Boryl radicals are defined as chemical species with an unpaired electron localized on the boron atom in a molecule. There is renewed interest in their discovery as they have recently showcased useful organic reactivities. While the first studies of boryl radicals involved borane radical anions, the study of overall neutral boryl radical species was unlocked through the investigation of what are referred to as ligated boryl radicals. A boryl radical in its isolated form has a three-center-five-electron (3c-5e) configuration, while the ligation results in its transformation to a four-center-seven-electron complex (4c-7e). These descriptions found in the literature refer to the number of coordinated atoms that surround the boron atom plus the boron atom, and the number of electrons involved in the immediate bonding environment. For example, in the case of the 3c-5e boryl radical, the boron is covalently bonded to two atoms (two bonds with two electrons each) and is predicted to have its unpaired electron in the sp^{2}-like orbital (1 electron). This leads to a highly reactive radical and an empty p orbital on the boron. In contrast, the ligated boryl radicals with a 4c-7e configuration have an additional, dative bond with a Lewis base, such that the sp^{2} orbital is now filled. In this configuration, the radical occupies the p orbital and has the appropriate symmetry to interact with the coordinated groups and the ligand, allowing the otherwise strongly lewis basic radical to be stabilized. These structures, and the stabilizing interactions are showcased in the figure below.

Boryl Radical Three-Dimensional Analogue of NHC-Stabilized Borafluorenium. 54% Radical character localized on Boron.

While the definition of the boryl radical requires the unpaired electron density to be localized on the boron atom, in practice the extent at which the radical spin density is localized on the boron itself can vary greatly (0.15 electrons to 0.90 electrons). This leads to a diverse list of structures that are studied as boryl radicals, as long as the boron has some calculated/measured radical character or showcases radical type reactivity in corresponding organic reactions. Examples to these structures include sigma-type boron radical anions generated from borane, trialkylamine- and dialkylsulphide- ligated radicals, boron-based heterocyclic radicals, N-heterocyclic carbene-stabilized boryl radicals, and a variety of ligated boryl radical anions and cations. Studies have also revealed cations that can undergo electrochemical reduction to form a neutral boryl radical species.

Study of boryl radicals have also allowed for probing the phenomenon referred to as Polarity-reversal catalysis (PRC) by Roberts and his colleagues, where a normally slow single-step hydrogen atom abstraction (HAT) reaction from an electron rich C-H bond can be split into two steps where the radicals and substrates are polarity matched in the presence of a nucleophilic hydridic catalyst, making it faster. Recent breakthroughs in stable and isolable boryl radicals such as borafluorene based radicals by the Gilliard group suggest a future where boryl radicals may find generalized use in new types of materials, as well as catalytic reactivities in a wider range of reactions.

== History of Boron Containing Molecules in Radical Chemistry ==
=== Boranes as Radical Sources ===
Investigations of organoboron compounds date as far back as 1860, when Sir Edward Frankland described a range of substitution reactions in which triethylborane is autoxidized in the presence of oxygen. More than a century later, the autoxidation of organoboranes was revealed to occur through a radical mechanism by B. P. Roberts and colleagues, and trialkylborane compounds established themselves as useful radical initiators. They were used in methyl-methacrylate polymerization initiation by Contreras as early as 1969. Although fascinatingly little was known about the mechanism, they noted that the reaction with just the peroxide and borane without oxygen was very slow, and reaction with peroxide with oxygen without borane was also similarly slow. This suggested that a radical species was involved that needed both the oxygen and the borane.

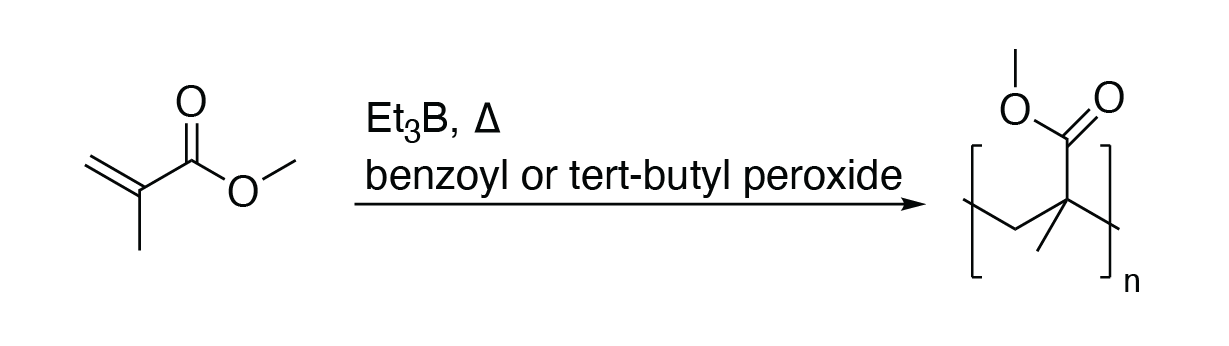
MMA Radical Chain Polymerization into PMMA Using trialkylborane as Radical Initiator

A couple potential radical initiation mechanisms are given below, where recent research the radical species and reactions that occur the chain reaction is highly complicated and even dependent on the amount of oxygen present.

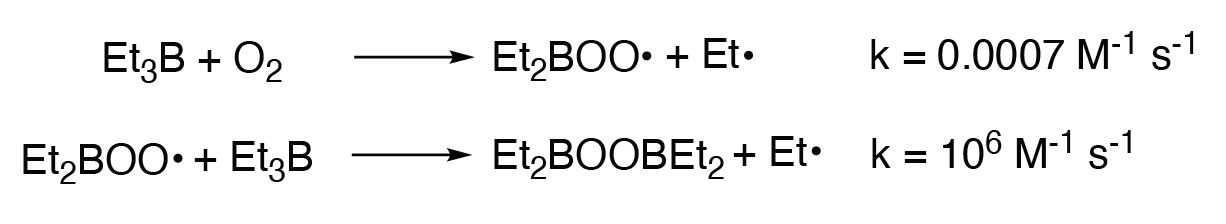
Example radical initiation reactions with autoxidation of triethylborane

Since then, organoboranes have demonstrated wide applicability in radical chemistry as chain-transfer reagents, radical precursors, reducing agents, and more. However, most of the relevant reagents containing boron in these reactions involve a radical species in which the radical itself is localized on an atom that is not boron. As a result, they are not considered boryl radicals. This is a very important distinction to make in the investigation and literature search associated with boron containing reagents in the context of radical based organic chemistry.

=== Radical Localized on the Boron Atom ===
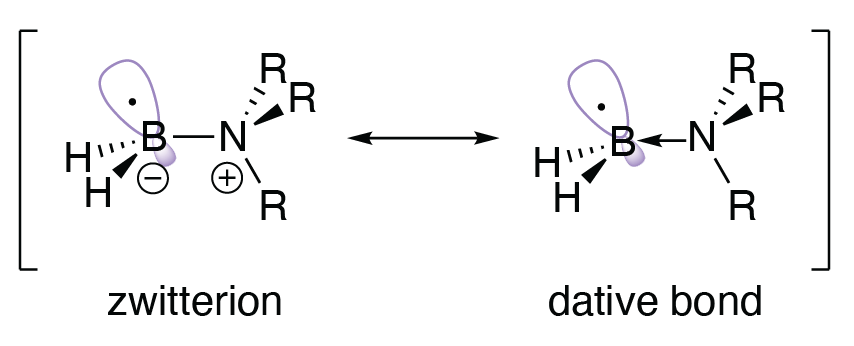
There are two ways to draw an amine-boryl radical as a zwitterion and with a dative bond.

The study of boryl radicals starts with the investigation of ligated 4c-7e species like trialkylborane given in the figure. The ligated forms of the boryl radical such as the one above were successfully identified in the 80s by Roberts et al. through electron spin resonance spectroscopy (ESR, now also referred to as electron paramagnetic resonance spectroscopy or EPR) and investigated in its reaction pathways through the decay of the EPR signal under reaction conditions. In the two decades following the first studies, the literature presents a considerable lack of interest for boryl radical species. The beginning of a new wave of recent interest in studying the radical species can be correlated with the successful isolation and structural analysis of persistent radicals starting in 2007 with Gabbai's acridinium moiety attached to a boryl radical. Around the same time, NHC-boranes were identified as atomic hydrogen donors in the radical deoxygenation of xanthanes in a cornerstone investigation by Curran et al. Following mechanistic studies led to the eventual identification of a boron centered radical intermediate. This resulted in a multitude of NHC-stabilized boryl radicals to be designed by exploiting the tunable electronic and steric characteristics of the carbene. The stability of the radicals has been successfully engineered to achieve kinetic persistency and thermodynamic stability such that they now allow for an investigation of radical containing organoboron complexes that are relevant for potential applications in materials. A recent example from the Gilliard group in 2020 is the persistent borafluorene radical which is not simply an intermediate species but demonstrates solid state and solution stability. Incorporating radicals onto functional boranes such as borafluorene may unlock new areas of materials research, by combining the luminescence and reactivity observed in borafluorene based materials. These properties can be potentially electronically addressable due to the presence of energetically accessible electrons provided by the radical species.

== Classes of Boryl Radicals ==
=== Non-Ligated, 3c-5e Type Radicals ===
The simplest type of boryl radicals are sigma-type 3c-5e radicals that have only been observed under extremely specialized conditions inside a specially constructed mass spectrometer. This was done under pyrolysis conditions at very high vacuum using a special quadrupole lens, wide slits and ionizing chamber open all sides to minimize wall collisions and a sensitive detector. This way, Fehlner and Koski were able to preserve the highly reactive species long enough to confirmed the presence of ·BH_{2} as a pyrolysis product in 1964. Since it is not stable, it is not a useful species other than for spectroscopic investigations.

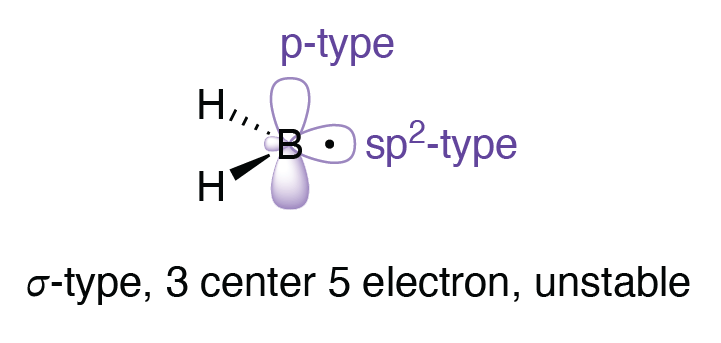
The 3c-5e boryl radical has both a reactive empty p orbital, and an sp2-type radical where the unpaired electron resides.

=== Ligated, 4c-7e Type Radicals ===
As highlighted in the above sections, the breakthrough was the stability introduced through the formation of a Lewis acid-Lewis base adduct whereby the electrons donated by the Lewis base stabilized the boryl radical. This was because the complex, now a 4c-7e boryl radical with the unpaired electron in a vertical p-type orbital. This suggested that the interaction between the ligand orbitals parallel to the out of plane p-orbital of the boryl radical was critical in determining its stability, and potentially with the alkyl framework surrounding the boron atom (though limited in correlation compared to the interaction with the lewis base).

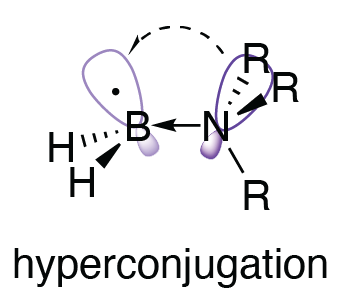
Hyperconjugation in Amine-Boryl Radicals causes a trigonal pyramidal geometry, consistent with EPR spectra.

Assuming the alkyl framework surrounding the boron center is flexible, if the lewis base donates a lot of electron density to the boryl radical via hyperconjugation, this manifests itself as an interaction which favors the trigonal pyramidal center over the trigonal planar at the boron center. While this is one of the electronic interaction that determines the geometry at the boryl radical center, there are other effects such as the electronic nature of the substrates covalently bonded to the boron, as well as back bonding to the ligand π-system (if present), both of which favor a trigonal planar geometry. In these cases, significant portion of the radical density is delocalized onto the Lewis base itself. Some possible interactions summarized as synergistic interactions by Lu et al, are given below. It is a combination of these which ends up deciding the geometry, stability and reactivity of a boryl radical at hand.

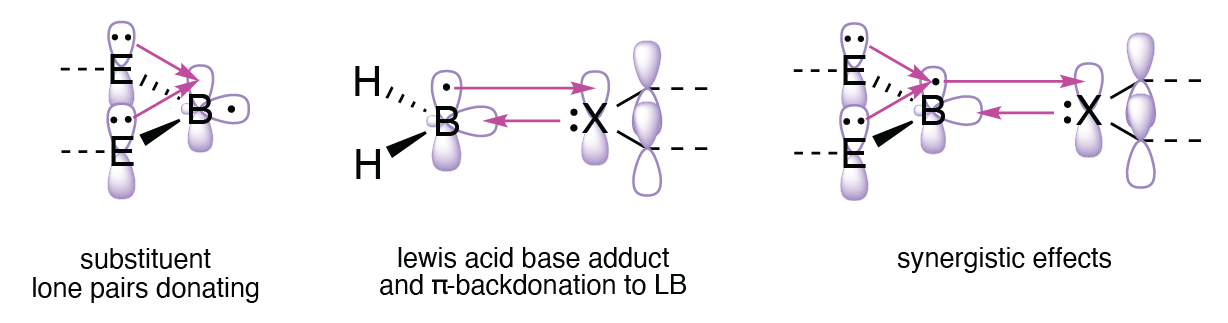
Stabilizing and Destabilizing Interactions Observed in Ligated 4c-7e boryl radicals

==== Tertiary-Amine-Boryl Radicals ====
Tertiary amine boryl radicals can be generated from the reaction of a tertiary amine boryl adduct with a heteroatom centered radical.

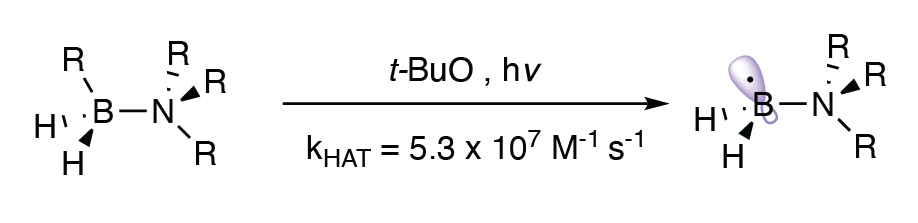
Synthesis of Amine-Boryl Radical inside an EPR Cavity

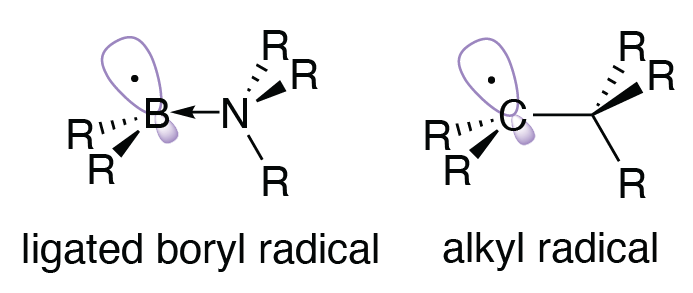
Ligated boryl radical and alkyl radical orbital picture, they appear isoelectronic, but react differently.

Even though the tertiary-amine-borylradical and alkyl radicals are isoelectronic with one another, the amine-boryl radical demonstrates reactivity similar to metalloidyl radicals such as trialkylsilyl and trialkylstannyl analogues. Even through they appear isoelectronic, the difference in reactivity can be attributed to the nature of the bonds and the orbitals involved in the dative interaction. A recent extensive survey by Nagib et al in 2024 quantifies the nucleophilic nature of the boryl radicals when compared with other radical species. The amine-boryl radicals also demonstrate distinct reactivity compared to the other metalloidyl radicals such as beta-scission and hydrogen atom transfer(HAT). Some of the reactivities observed are presented below as seen in publications by Roberts et al. as compiled by the Knowles group.

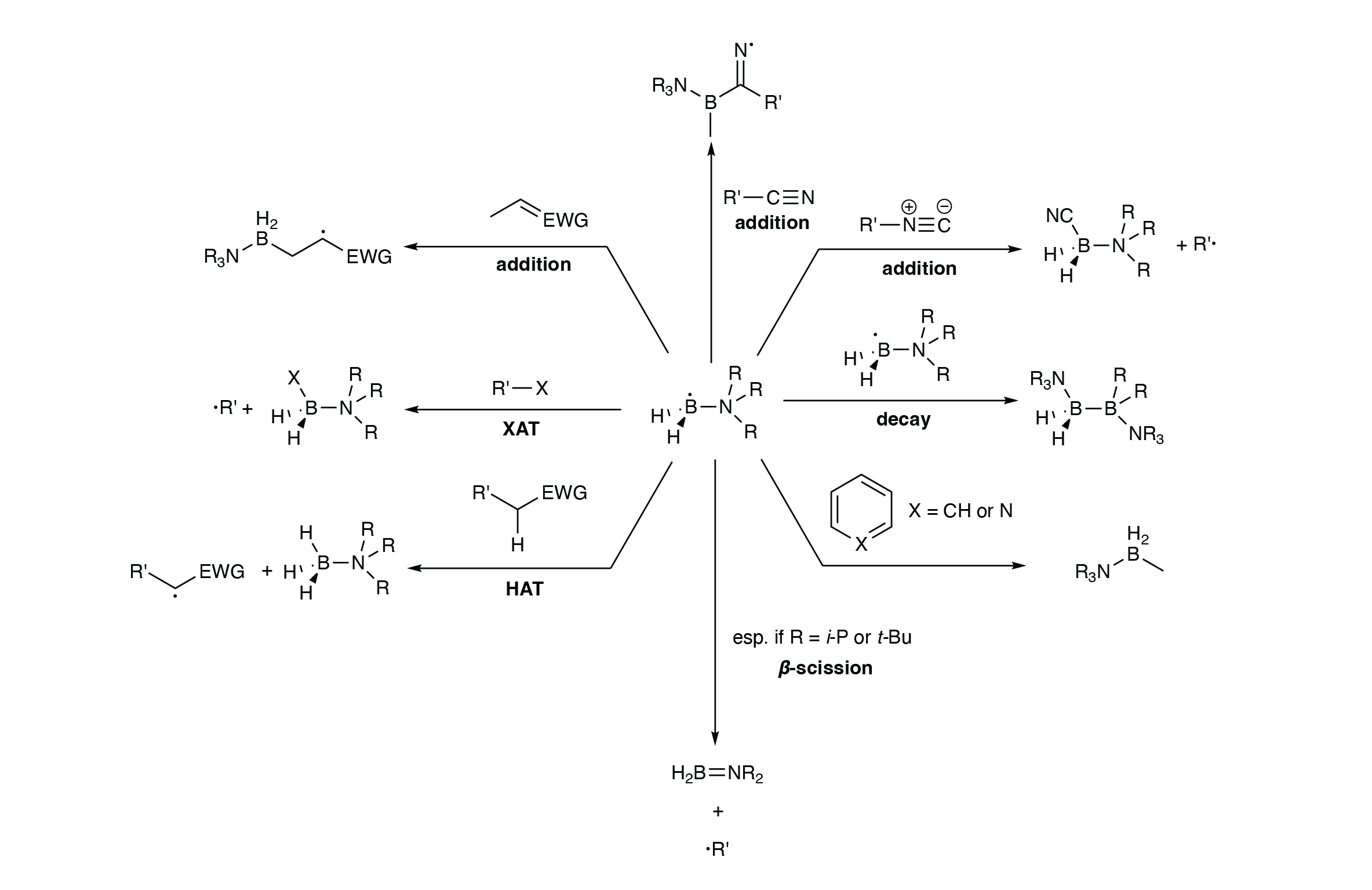
Various reactivities observed for Amine-Boryl radicals.

==== Phosphine-boryl and dialkyl sulfide-boryl radicals ====
Similar to the amine-boryl radical, phosphine boryls can also be generated inside the EPR cavity by reacting with a radical on a heterolytic atom. The hyperfine structure of the EPR spectra suggests that these are both closer to a trigonal planar geometry at the boron center.

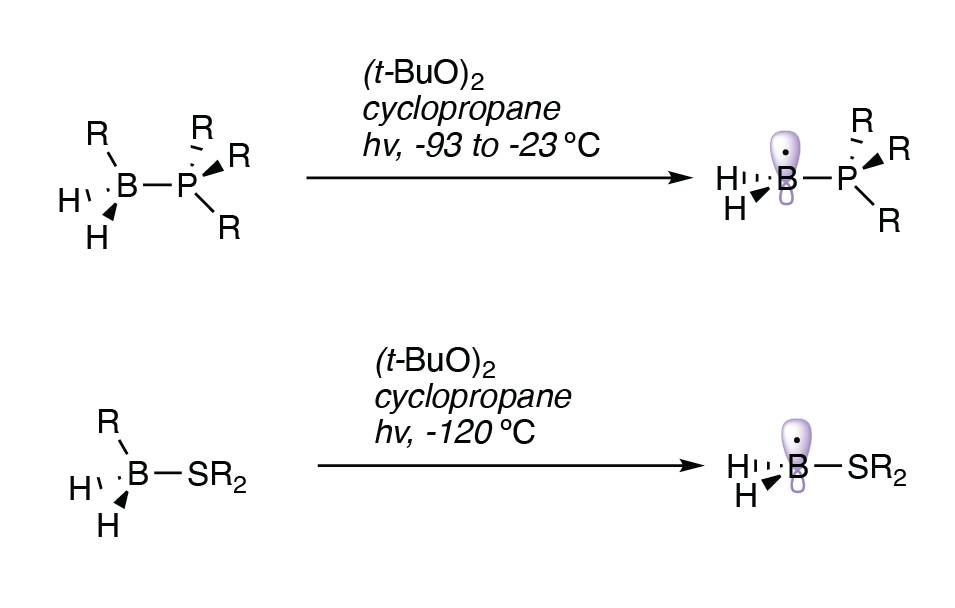
Synthesis of Phosphine-boryl radical and dialkylsulfide-boryl radical in an EPR cavity

Phosphine-boryl radicals and dialkyl sulfide-boryl radicals were found to be distinct in their reactivities. Phosphine-boryl radicals were less reactive towards halogen atom transfer (XAT) , β-scission and addition reactions and the dialkyl-sulfide-boryl radicals were very reactive for XAT and β-scission, where XAT was faster.

The investigation into the more stable ligated-boryl radical species and their reactivity therefore showcased a variety of interesting reactions and established more stable and tunable analogues.

==== Carbene-Stabilized Radicals ====
The first isolable example of a boryl radical ligated by a carbene analogue was a 9-borylated acridinyl-radical synthesized by Gabbai in 2007, lending credibility to the idea that persistent boryl radicals could be obtained through other strongly binding ligand systems with steric and electronic tunability. The use of N-heterocyclic carbenes (NHCs) as a way to stabilize boryl radicals was first demonstrated as a part of the mechanism involving the radical deoxygenation of xanthanes using NHC-boranes, which had previously been synthesized by Kuhn. They were able to isolate NHC-(methylthiocarbonylthio)borane as a solid product from the reaction of xanthanes and NHC-borane with Et_{3}B/O_{2} as a radical initiator. The product, rate and EPR experiments supported the presence of a boryl radical with spin delocalization onto the NHC-π-system orbitals whereby the radical demonstrated π-character.

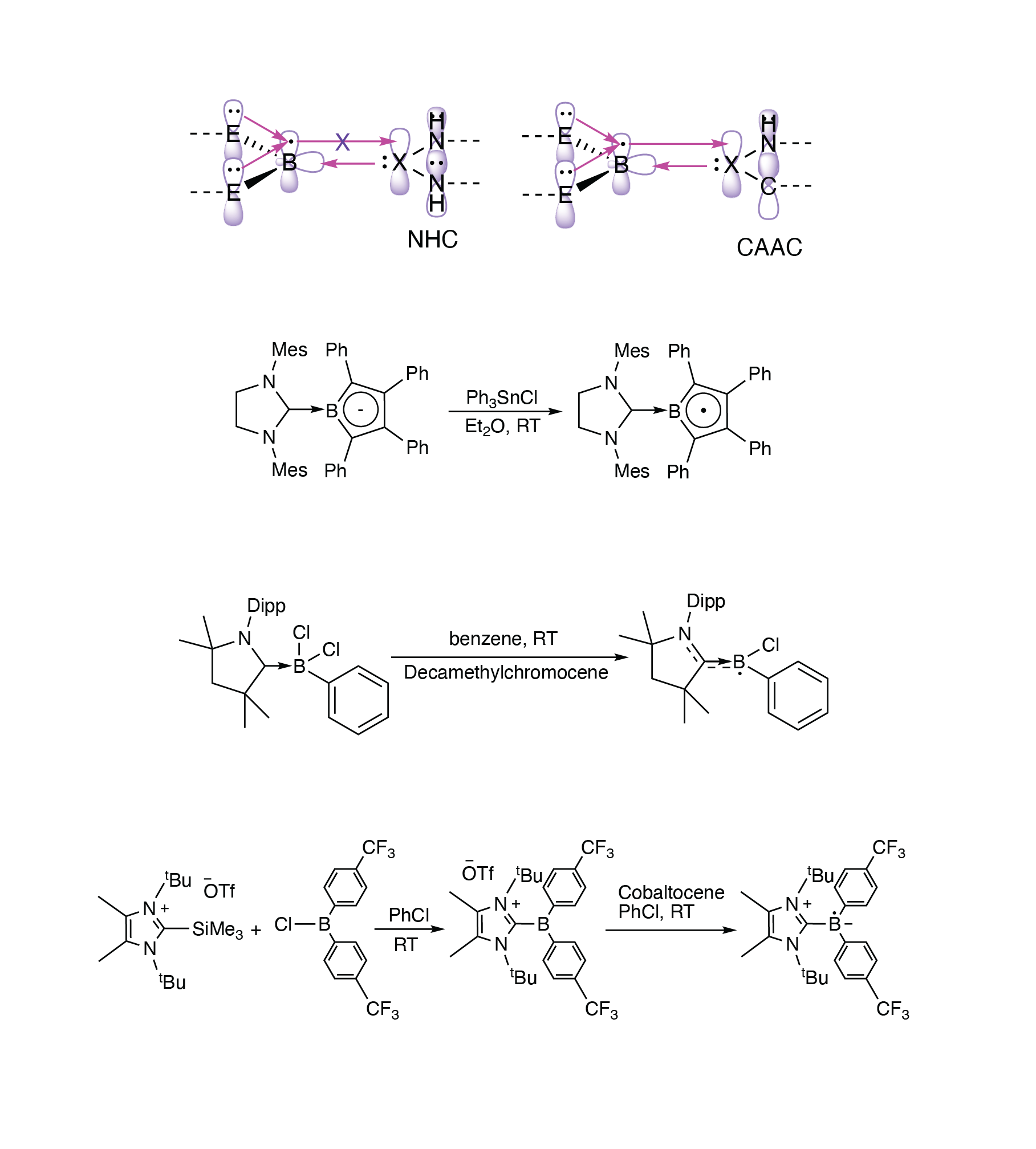
Various NHC and CAAC Stabilized Boryl Radicals

This then led to the synthesis of a persistent NHC-boryl radical from a NHC-borenium cation reduced with magnesium. It was identified as a part of the reaction mixture, but unfortunately could not be isolated and stored. The first isolable NHC-stabilized boryl radical was synthesized by Braunschweig from an NHC-borolyl anion reduced by a single electron using triphenyltin chloride as a reducing agent. Cyclic alkyl amino carbene (CAAC) ligands are similarly strongly σ donating carbene ligands like NHCs, but are missing a nitrogen atom adjacent to the carbene, and as a result are much better π-acceptors compared to NHCs. CAAC based boryl radicals were also synthesized. An example to a CAAC analogue by Braunschweig and was synthesized via a reduction of an adduct with decamethylchromocene. One of the radicals with the largest spin density on the boron atom itself, as revealed by the hyperfine coupling observed in the EPR spectra, is the following diarylboryl radical stabilized by an NHC. The spin density on the boron is found to be diminished and highly delocalized to the CAAC system which lacks one of the nitrogens in the heterocycle, while NHCs with their significantly less π-accepting character appear to showcase the larger spin densities localized on the boron atom. In the decade following, there have been many persistent and isolable boryl radicals synthesized through a multitude of reactions, most of which appear to involve the redox chemistry of a stable precursor anion or cation, where the increased stability allows for increased tunability of the reactivity of the radical complex.

== Applications ==
=== Organic Reactivity ===
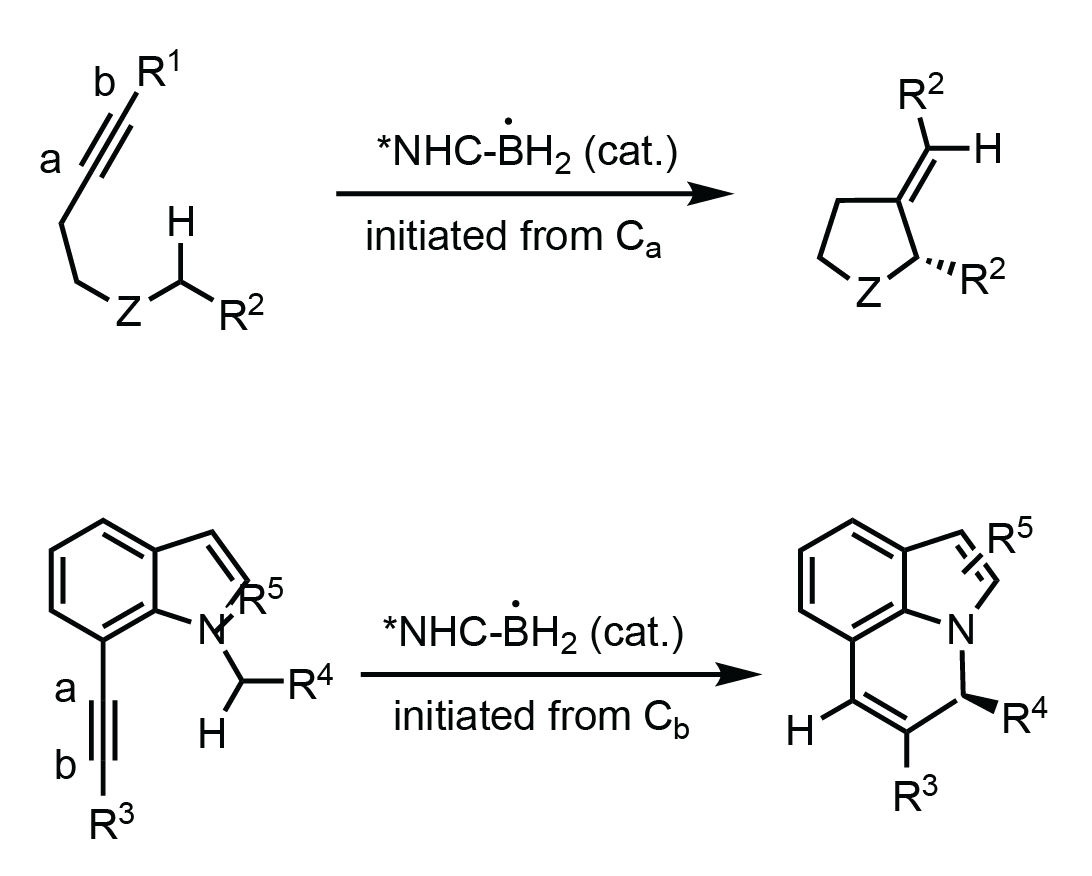
Example of an asymmetric catalysis using an NHC-boryl radical

The newly synthesized NHC and CAAC-boryl radicals and their analogues have been implemented as radical mediators, reactants and boron sources in various contexts.

One of the ways in which the tunable ligand environment directly presents itself as an advantage is found in the highly active area of asymmetric catalysis of organic reactions. An example of this is demonstrated in the context of radical cycloisomerization reactions.

=== Potential use in Materials ===
NHC-Borafluorene Radical by Gilliard et al.

Boron-doped polycyclic aromatic hydrocarbons (B-PAHs) are known to exhibit a variety of electronic and optical properties. To understand these heterocyclic aromatic compounds better, model systems could be a good way to probe the underlying principles. With this goal in mind, it is therefore valuable to synthesize "B-doped aromatic systems" with different electronic landscapes by introducing defects into the band structure.

With this goal in mind, persistent borafluorene radicals were recently synthesized using both NHC and CAAC ligands which yielded blue and purple crystals respectively, hinting at their tunable electronic environments. The net spin density located on the CAAC (0.38 electrons) was calculated to be more than double that of NHC (0.16 electrons), in agreement with lesser π accepting character of NHC induced by the additional N lone-pair.

Persistent CAAC-Borafluorene Ligand by Gilliard et al.

Another system that has recently been explored is the borepin which is a 7 membered ring with 6π-electron B-PAH. It was also easy to synthesize its anion analogue through a single electron reduction. These investigations not led to a new boryl radical environment to model aromatic systems, but also suggested that a stable radical can act as an intermediate to access the corresponding reduced or oxidized anion species. These electronically addressable molecules are projected to electronically and optically tune materials they are implemented in.

Larger and more complicated polycyclic aromatic hydrocarbon frameworks can also be accessed as of 2023, where Gilliard et al. reported a new Bis(9-Boraphenanthrene) and its biradical through a facile, one-pot synthesis. It also interestingly showcases an open-shell singlet boron-doped biradical with usually high 95% biradical character when using a CAAC ligand.
