= Catecholborane =

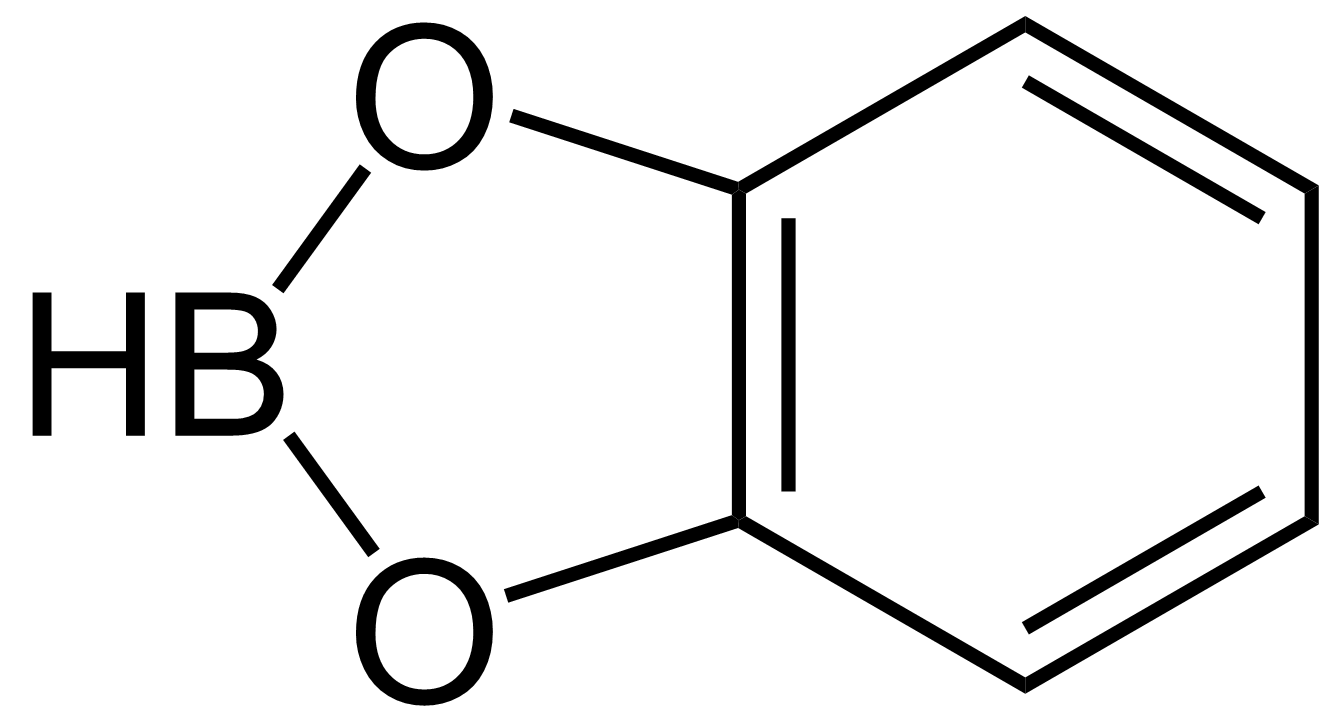

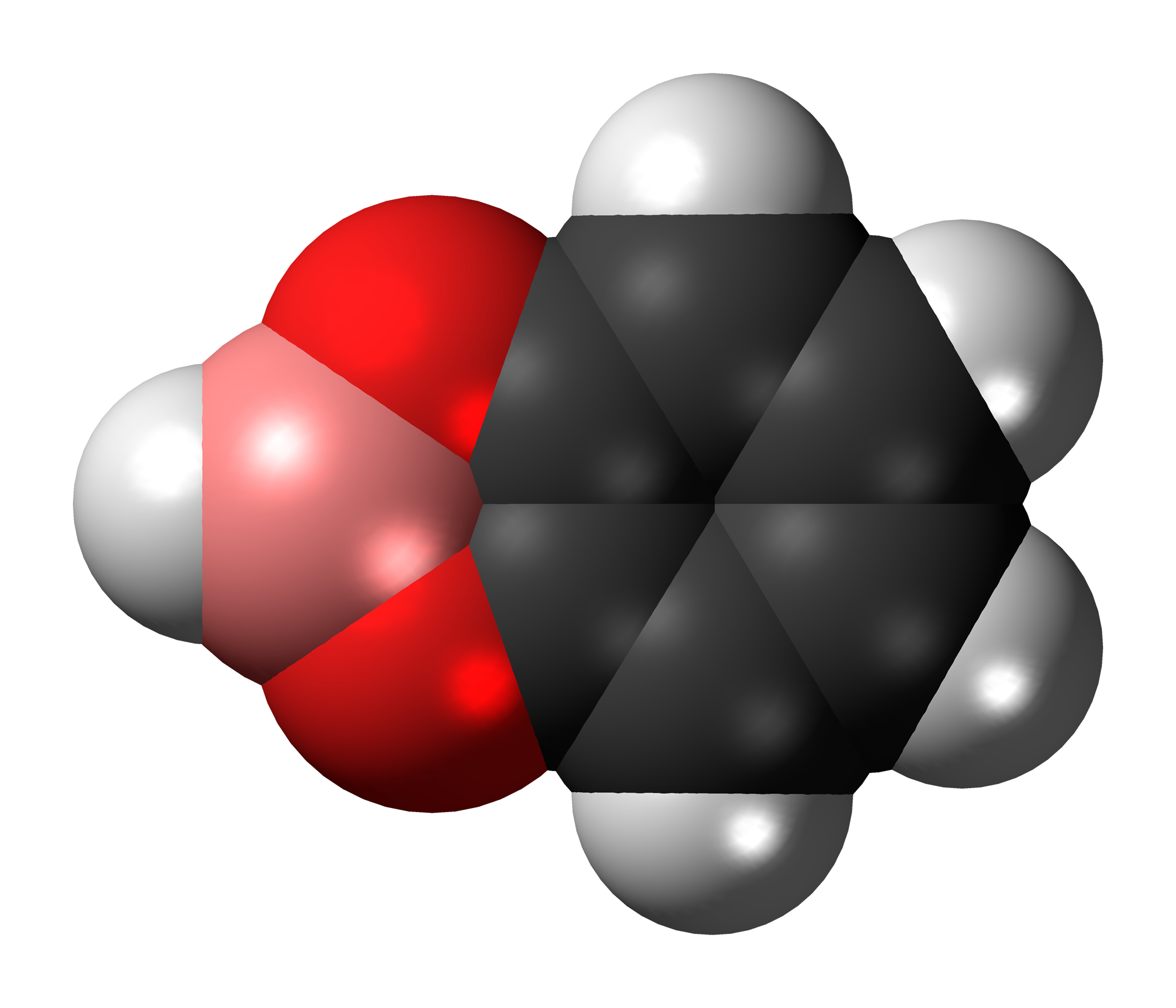

Names
- Preferred IUPAC name 2H-1,3,2-Benzodioxaborole
- Other names 7,9-dioxa-8λ2-borabicyclo[4.3.0]nona-1,3,5-triene

Identifiers
CAS Number	274-07-7
3D model (JSmol)	Interactive image; Interactive image
ChemSpider	10617125
ECHA InfoCard	100.005.447
EC Number	205-991-5
PubChem CID	6327445
UNII	UB69382H5J
CompTox Dashboard (EPA)	DTXSID3059769
- InChI: InChI=1S/C6H5BO2/c1-2-4-6-5(3-1)8-7-9-6/h1-4,7H Key: CENMEJUYOOMFFZ-UHFFFAOYSA-N; InChI=1/C6H5BO2/c1-2-4-6-5(3-1)8-7-9-6/h1-4,7H Key: CENMEJUYOOMFFZ-UHFFFAOYAI
- SMILES: [B]1OC2=CC=CC=C2O1; c1cccc2OBOc12

Properties
Chemical formula	C_{6}H_{5}BO_{2}
Molar mass	119.92 g/mol
Appearance	Colorless liquid
Density	1.125 g/cm^{3}, liquid
Melting point	12 °C (54 °F; 285 K)
Boiling point	50 °C (122 °F; 323 K) at 50 mmHg

Hazards
- GHS labelling
Pictograms	(GHS02: Flammable) (GHS05: Corrosive)
Signal word	Danger
Hazard statements	H225, H314
Precautionary statements	P210, P233, P240, P241, P242, P243, P260, P264, P280, P301+P330+P331, P303+P361+P353, P304+P340, P305+P351+P338, P310, P321, P363, P370+P378, P403+P235, P405, P501
NFPA 704 (fire diamond)	1 4 2 W
Flash point	2 °C (36 °F; 275 K)
- Except where otherwise noted, data are given for materials in their standard state (at 25 °C [77 °F], 100 kPa). verify (what is ?) Infobox references

Catecholborane (abbreviated HBcat) is an organoboron compound that is useful in organic synthesis. This colourless liquid is a derivative of catechol and a borane, having the formula C_{6}H_{4}O_{2}BH.

== Synthesis and structure ==
Traditionally catecholborane is produced by treating catechol with borane (BH_{3}) in a cooled solution of THF. However, this method results in a loss of 2 mole equivalents of the hydride. Nöth and Männig described the reaction of alkali-metal boron hydride (LiBH_{4}, NaBH_{4}, KBH_{4}) with tris(catecholato)bisborane in an ethereal solvent such as diethyl ether. In 2001, Herbert Brown and coworkers prepared catecholborane by treatment of tri-o-phenylene bis-borate with diborane.

Unlike borane itself or alkylboranes, catechol borane exists as a monomer. This behavior is a consequence of the electronic influence of the aryloxy groups that diminish the Lewis acidity of the boron centre. Pinacolborane adopts a similar structure.

== Reactions ==
Catecholborane is less reactive in hydroborations than borane-THF or borane-dimethylsulfide.

When catecholborane is treated with a terminal alkyne, a trans vinylborane is formed:

C_{6}H_{4}O_{2}BH + HC_{2}R → C_{6}H_{4}O_{2}B-CHCHR

The product is a precursor to the Suzuki reaction and is the only borane which stops at the alkene instead of reacting further to the alkane.

Catecholborane may be used as a stereoselective reducing agent when converting β-hydroxy ketones to syn 1,3-diols.

Catecholborane oxidatively adds to low valent metal complexes, affording boryl complexes.

C_{6}H_{4}O_{2}BH + Pt(PR_{3})_{2} → (C_{6}H_{4}O_{2}B)Pt(PR_{3})_{2}H
