= Pinacolborane =

Names
- Preferred IUPAC name 4,4,5,5-Tetramethyl-1,3,2-dioxaborolane
- Other names HBpin

Identifiers
CAS Number	25015-63-8
3D model (JSmol)	Interactive image
ChemSpider	2016512
ECHA InfoCard	100.118.700
EC Number	607-485-3
PubChem CID	6364989
UNII	BA5Z9NE6HM
CompTox Dashboard (EPA)	DTXSID30422852
- InChI: InChI=1S/C6H12BO2/c1-5(2)6(3,4)9-7-8-5/h1-4H3 Key: LZPWAYBEOJRFAX-UHFFFAOYSA-N
- SMILES: [B]1OC(C(O1)(C)C)(C)C

Properties
Chemical formula	C_{6}H_{13}BO_{2}
Molar mass	127.98 g·mol^{−1}
Appearance	colorless liquid
Density	0.882 g/cm^{3}
Boiling point	42–43 °C (108–109 °F; 315–316 K) 50 mmHg

Hazards
- GHS labelling
Pictograms	(GHS02: Flammable) (GHS05: Corrosive) (GHS07: Exclamation mark)
Signal word	Danger
Hazard statements	H220, H225, H260, H261, H315, H318
Precautionary statements	P210, P223, P231+P232, P233, P240, P241, P242, P243, P264, P280, P302+P352, P303+P361+P353, P305+P351+P338, P310, P321, P332+P313, P335+P334, P362, P370+P378, P377, P381, P402+P404, P403, P403+P235, P501
- Except where otherwise noted, data are given for materials in their standard state (at 25 °C [77 °F], 100 kPa). Infobox references

Pinacolborane is the borane with the formula (CH_{3})_{4}C_{2}O_{2}BH. Often pinacolborane is abbreviated HBpin. It features a boron hydride functional group incorporated in a five-membered C_{2}O_{2}B ring. Like related boron alkoxides, pinacolborane is monomeric. It is a colorless liquid. It features a reactive B-H functional group.

== Use in organic synthesis ==
In the presence of catalysts, pinacolborane hydroborates alkenes and, less rapidly, alkynes.

Pinacolborane also affects catalyst-free hydroboration of aldehydes, ketones, and carboxylic acids.

Pinacolborane is used in borylation, a form of C-H activation.

Dehydrogenation of pinacolborane affords dipinacolatodiborane (B_{2}pin_{2}):

2 (CH_{3})_{4}C_{2}O_{2}BH → (CH_{3})_{4}C_{2}O_{2}B-BO_{2}C_{2}(CH_{3})_{4} + H_{2}

== Related compounds ==
- Catecholborane
