= Transition metal boryl complex =

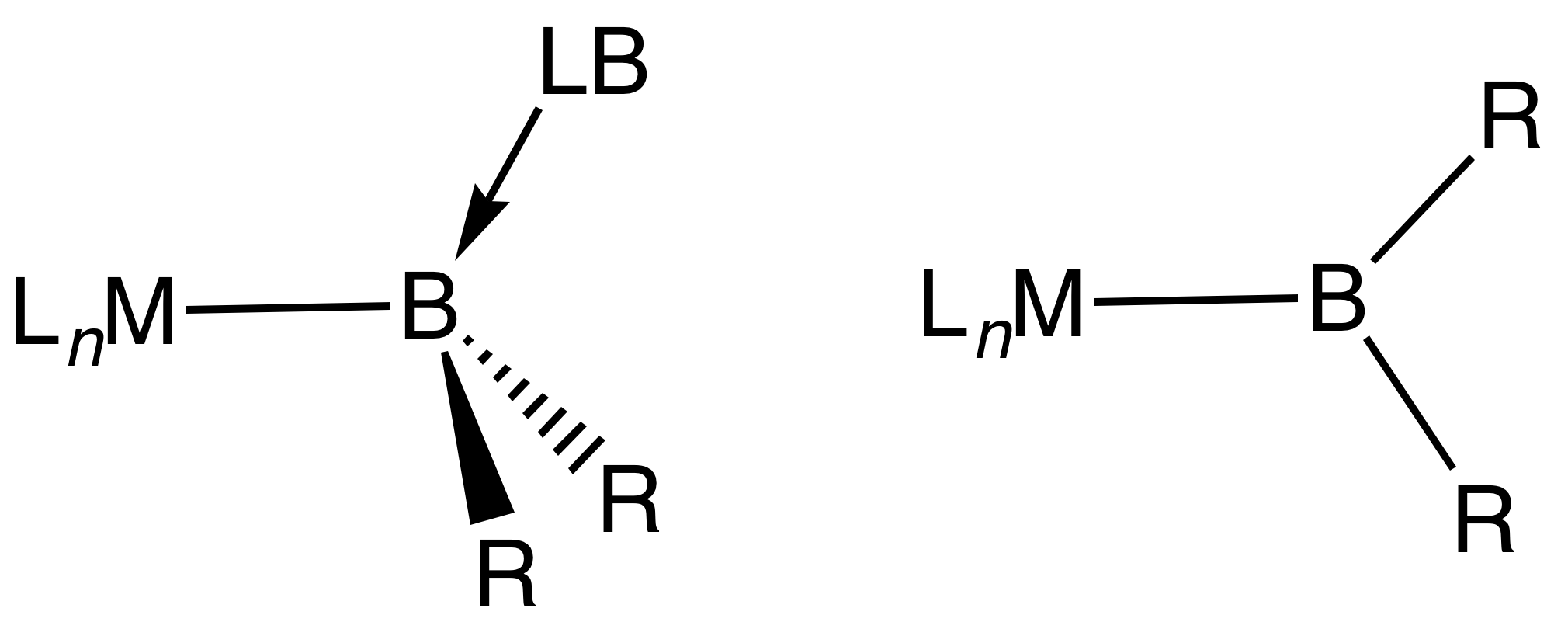
Structure of boryl ligands in metal complexes.

In chemistry, a transition metal boryl complex is a molecular species with a formally anionic boron center coordinated to a transition metal. They have the formula L_{n}M-BR_{2} or L_{n}M-(BR_{2}LB) (L = ligand, R = H, organic substituent, LB = Lewis base). One example is (C_{5}Me_{5})Mn(CO)_{2}(BH_{2}PMe_{3}) (Me = methyl). Such compounds, especially those derived from catecholborane and the related pinacolborane, are intermediates in transition metal-catalyzed borylation reactions.

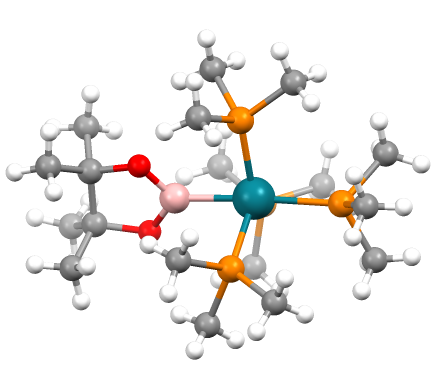
Structure of (PMe_{3})_{4}RhB(pinacolate). (color code: pink=B, blue green=Rh, red=O, orange=P).

== Synthesis ==
Oxidative addition is the main route to metal boryl complexes. Both B-H and B-B bonds add to low-valent metal complexes. For example, catecholborane oxidatively adds to Pt(0) to give the boryl hydride.

C_{6}H_{4}O_{2}BH + Pt(PR_{3})_{2} → C_{6}H_{4}O_{2}B Pt(PR_{3})_{2}H

Addition of diboron tetrafluoride to Vaska's complex gives the triboryl iridium(III) derivative:

2 B_{2}F_{4} + IrCl(CO)(PPh_{3})_{2} → Ir(BF_{2})_{3}(CO)(PPh_{3})_{2} + ClBF_{2}
