= 10-Hydroxy Lycopodium alkaloids =

Class of chemical compounds

The 10-hydroxy Lycopodium alkaloids, which include 10-hydroxylycopodine, deacetylpaniculine, and paniculine, are a series of natural products isolated from a Chilean club moss Lycopodium confertum. Deacetylpaniculine and paniculine were also isolated from Lycopodium paniculatum.

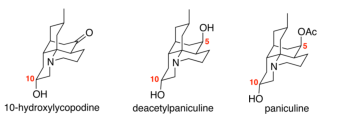

The Lycopodium alkaloids are of interest due to their biological activity and unique skeletal characteristics, however, many compounds in this class have not been well studied.

== Synthesis ==
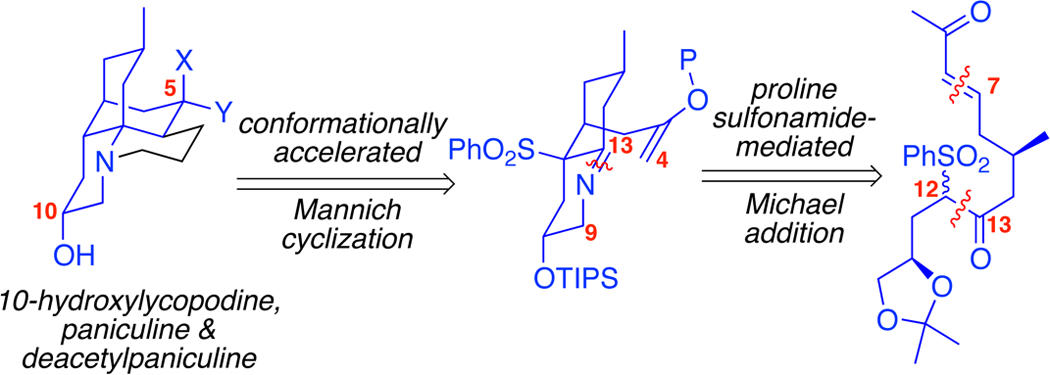

The first enantioselective synthesis of 10-hydroxylycopodine, deacetylpaniculine and paniculine was published by Mrinmoy Saha and Rich Carter in 2013. Two key ring-closure steps were accomplished by an organocatalytic Michael reaction and a Lewis acid-catalyzed Mannich reaction. The impact of the C10 stereochemistry on the Michael addition to construct the C7–C12 bond and on the Mannich cyclization have been explored recently.

== See also ==
- Lycopodium powder
- Lycopodium clavatum
