= Chlorobis(cyclooctene)iridium dimer =

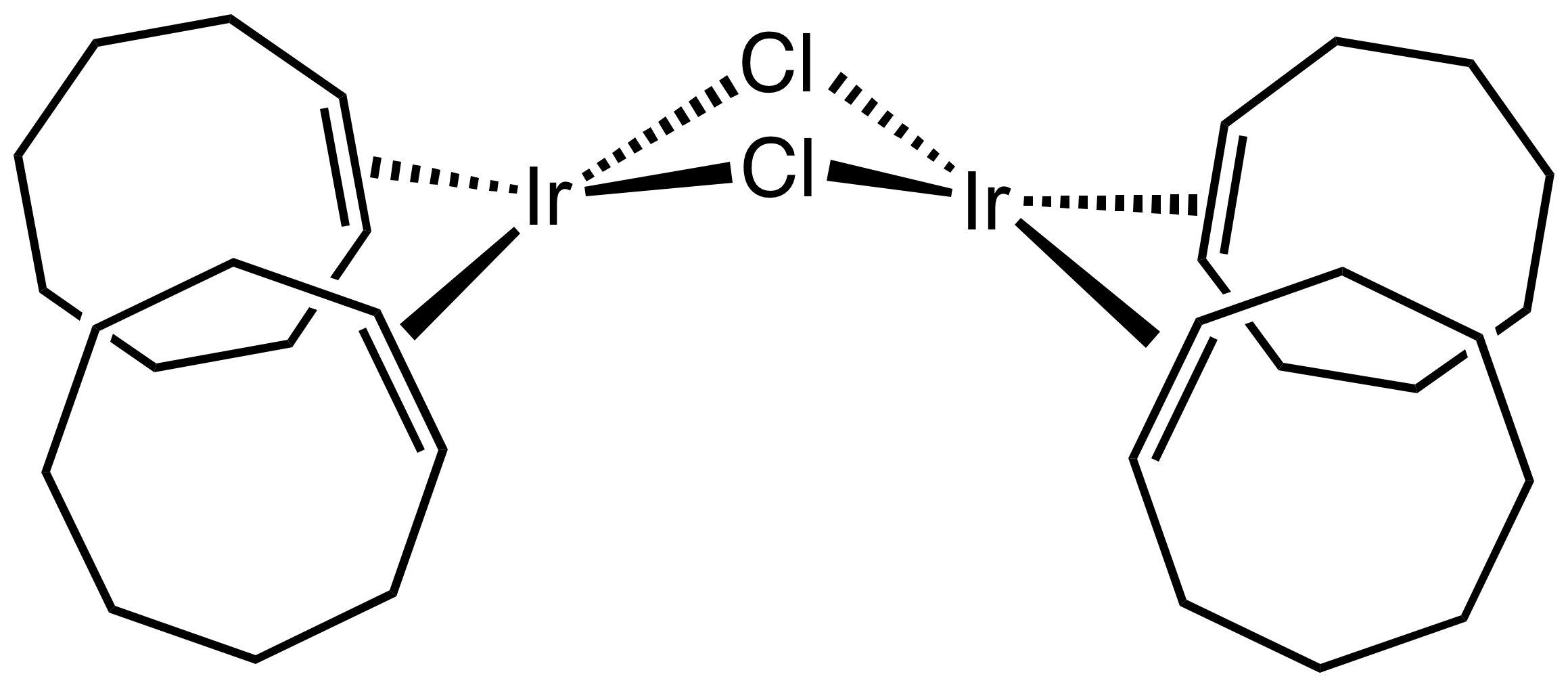

Names
- IUPAC name Chlorobis(cyclooctene)iridium(I) dimer
- Other names Di-μ-chlorotetrakis(cyclooctene)diiridium(I), [Ir(coe)_{2}Cl]_{2}

Identifiers
| CAS Number | 12246-51-4 |
| 3D model (JSmol) | Interactive image |
| ECHA InfoCard | 100.159.657 |
| EC Number | 631-416-6 |
| PubChem CID | 91972094 |
| CompTox Dashboard (EPA) | DTXSID001045899 |
- InChI: InChI=1S/4C8H14.2ClH.2Ir/c4*1-2-4-6-8-7-5-3-1;;;;/h4*1-2H,3-8H2;2*1H;;/p-2/b4*2-1-;;;; Key: CJJIQMGSHWWMCK-XFCUKONHSA-L
- SMILES: C1CCCC=CCC1.C1CCCC=CCC1.C1CCCC=CCC1.C1CCCC=CCC1.[Cl-].[Cl-].[Ir].[Ir]

Properties
| Chemical formula | C_{32}H_{56}Cl_{2}Ir_{2} |
| Molar mass | 896.13 |
| Appearance | yellow solid |
| Melting point | 160-165 °C |

Hazards
- GHS labelling
| Pictograms | (GHS07: Exclamation mark) |
| Signal word | Warning |
| Hazard statements | H315, H319, H335 |
| Precautionary statements | P261, P280, P304+P340, P305+P351+P338, P321, P332+P313, P362, P403+P233, P405, P501 |
- Except where otherwise noted, data are given for materials in their standard state (at 25 °C [77 °F], 100 kPa). Infobox references

Chlorobis(cyclooctene)iridium dimer is an organoiridium compound with the formula Ir_{2}Cl_{2}(C_{8}H_{14})_{4}, where C_{8}H_{14} is cis-cyclooctene. Sometimes abbreviated Ir_{2}Cl_{2}(coe)_{4}, it is a yellow, air-sensitive solid that is used as a precursor to many other organoiridium compounds and catalysts.

The compound is prepared by heating an alcohol solution of sodium hexachloroiridate with cyclooctene in ethanol. The coe ligands are easily displaced by other more basic ligands, more so than the diene ligands in the related complex cyclooctadiene iridium chloride dimer. For example, with triphenylphosphine (PPh_{3}), it reacts to give IrCl(PPh_{3})_{3}:

Ir_{2}Cl_{2}(C_{8}H_{14})_{4} + 6 PPh_{3} → 2 IrCl(PPh_{3})_{3} + 4 C_{8}H_{14}
