= Cyclooctadiene iridium chloride dimer =

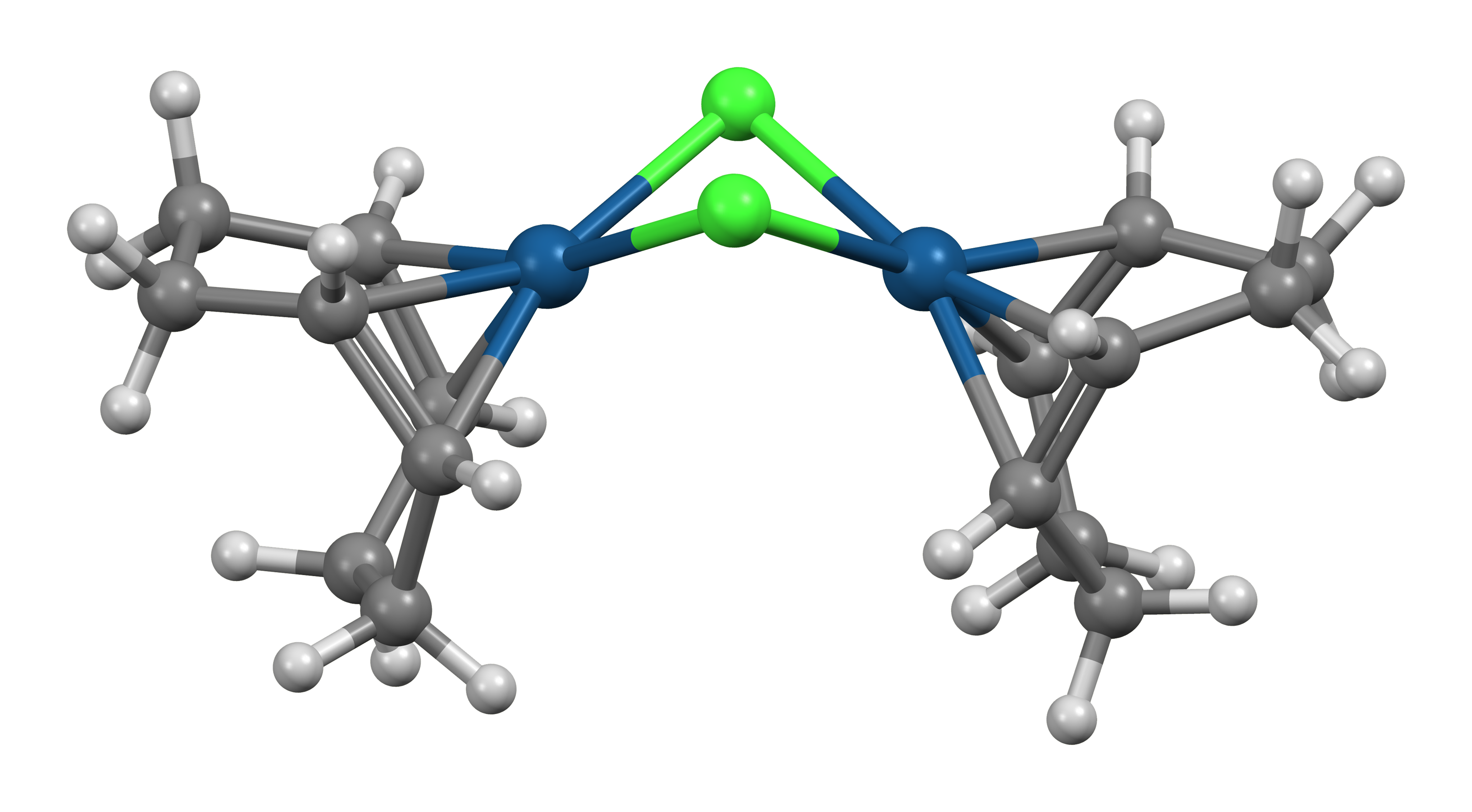

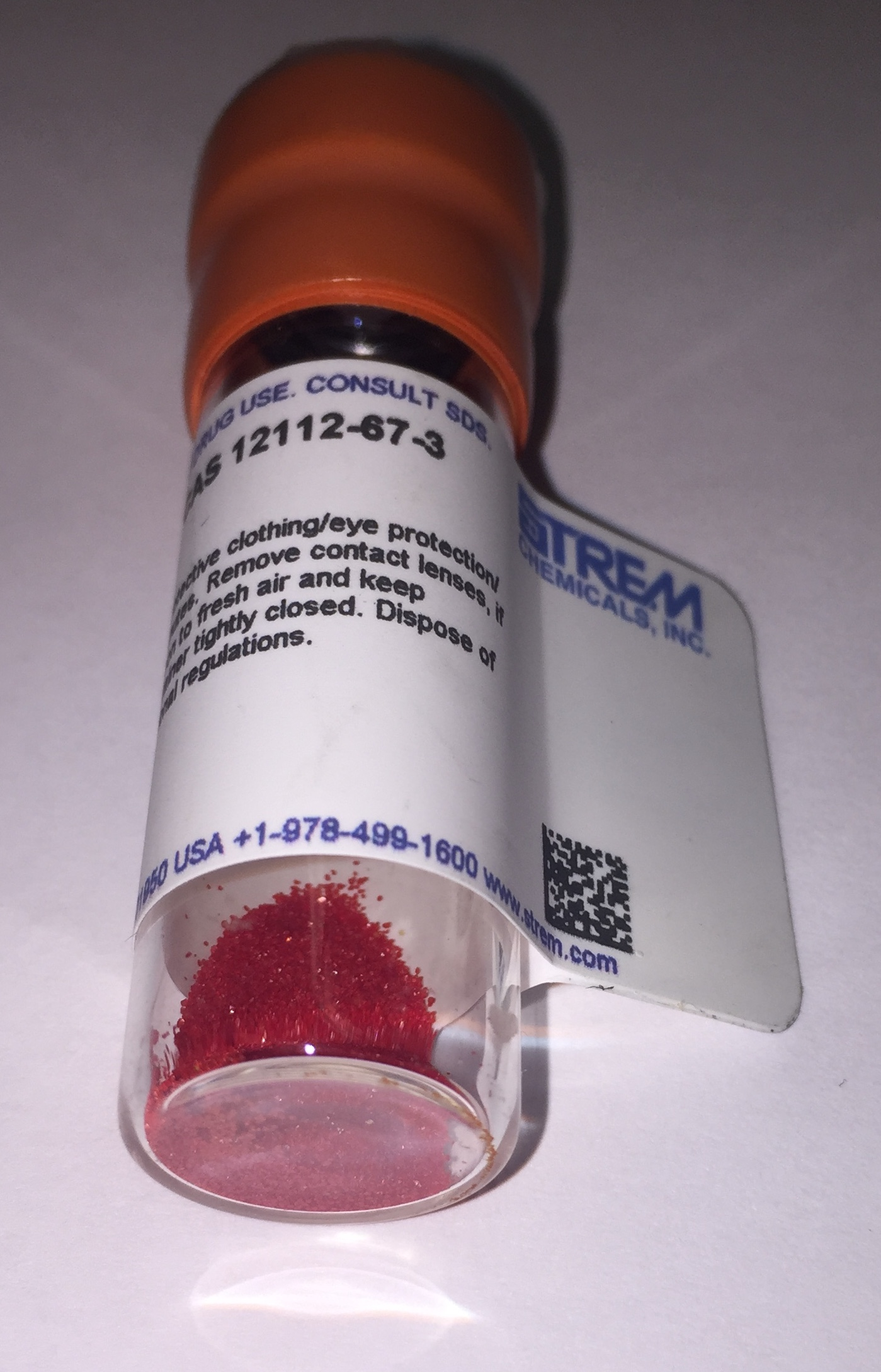

Names
- Other names Bis(1,5-cyclooctadiene)diiridium(I) dichloride

Identifiers
CAS Number	12112-67-3
3D model (JSmol)	Interactive image
ChemSpider	21171240
ECHA InfoCard	100.031.961
EC Number	235-170-7
CompTox Dashboard (EPA)	DTXSID00923689
- InChI: InChI=1S/2C8H12.2ClH.2Ir/c2*1-2-4-6-8-7-5-3-1;;;;/h2*1-2,7-8H,3-6H2;2*1H;;/q;;;;2*+1/p-2/b2*2-1-,8-7-;;;; Key: ZFOUDQNHNLDNLD-MIXQCLKLSA-L
- SMILES: C1/C=C\CC/C=C\C1.C1/C=C\CC/C=C\C1.[Cl].[Cl].[Ir].[Ir]

Properties
Chemical formula	C_{16}H_{24}Cl_{2}Ir_{2}
Molar mass	671.70
Appearance	red-orange solid
Density	2.65 g/cm^{3} (red polymorph)

Hazards
- GHS labelling
Pictograms	(GHS07: Exclamation mark)
Signal word	Warning
Hazard statements	H302, H312, H315, H319, H335
Precautionary statements	P261, P264, P270, P271, P280, P301+P312, P302+P352, P304+P340, P305+P351+P338, P312, P321, P322, P330, P332+P313, P337+P313, P362, P363, P403+P233, P405, P501
- Except where otherwise noted, data are given for materials in their standard state (at 25 °C [77 °F], 100 kPa). Infobox references

Cyclooctadiene iridium chloride dimer is an organoiridium compound with the formula [Ir(μ^{2}-Cl)(COD)]_{2}, where COD is the diene 1,5-cyclooctadiene (C_{8}H_{12}). It is an orange-red solid that is soluble in organic solvents. The complex is used as a precursor to other iridium complexes, some of which are used in homogeneous catalysis. The solid is air-stable but its solutions degrade in air.

== Preparation, structure, reactions ==
The compound is prepared by heating hydrated iridium trichloride and cyclooctadiene in alcohol solvent. In the process, Ir(III) is reduced to Ir(I).

In terms of its molecular structure, the iridium centers are square planar as is typical for a d^{8} complex. The Ir_{2}Cl_{2} core is folded with a dihedral angle of 86°. The molecule crystallizes in yellow-orange and red-orange polymorphs; the latter one is more common.

The complex is widely used precursor to other iridium complexes. A notable derivative is Crabtree's catalyst. The chloride ligands can also be replaced with methoxide to give cyclooctadiene iridium methoxide dimer, Ir_{2}(OCH_{3})_{2}(C_{8}H_{12})_{2}. The cyclooctadiene ligand is prone to isomerize in cationic complexes of the type [(C_{8}H_{12})IrL_{2}]^{+}.

== See also ==
- Chlorobis(cyclooctene)iridium dimer
- Cyclooctadiene rhodium chloride dimer
