= Cyclooctadiene iridium methoxide dimer =

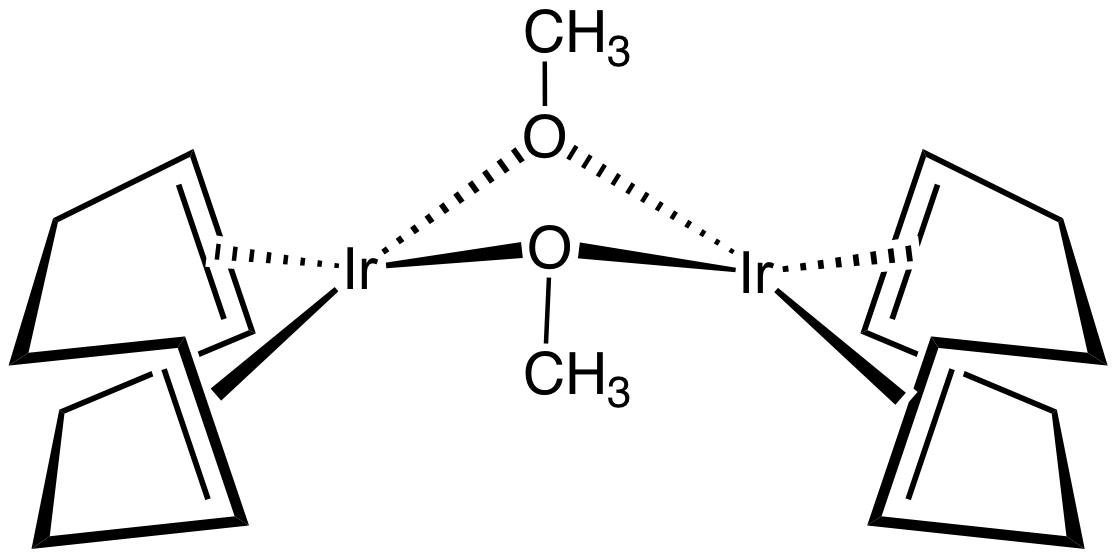

Names
- Other names bis[(cyclooctadiene]di-μ-methoxydiiridium

Identifiers
| CAS Number | 12148-71-9 |
| 3D model (JSmol) | Interactive image |
| ChemSpider | 21241875 |
| ECHA InfoCard | 100.156.683 |
| PubChem CID | 53216975 with error |
- InChI: InChI=1S/2C8H12.2CH3O.4CH3.2Ir/c2*1-2-4-6-8-7-5-3-1;2*1-2;;;;;;/h2*1-2,7-8H,3-6H2;2*1H3;4*1H3;;/b2*2-1-,8-7-;;;;;;;; Key: KIQXVKYWEDSHED-SXGOCSEPSA-N
- SMILES: CO1[Ir](O([Ir]1(C)C)C)(C)C.C1/C=C\CC/C=C\C1.C1/C=C\CC/C=C\C1

Properties
| Chemical formula | C_{18}H_{30}Ir_{2}O_{2} |
| Molar mass | 662.870 g·mol^{−1} |
| Appearance | yellow solid |
| Density | 2.552 g/cm^{3} |
- Except where otherwise noted, data are given for materials in their standard state (at 25 °C [77 °F], 100 kPa). Infobox references

Cyclooctadiene iridium methoxide dimer is an organoiridium compound with the formula Ir_{2}(OCH_{3})_{2}(C_{8}H_{12})_{2}, where C_{8}H_{12} is the diene 1,5-cyclooctadiene. It is a yellow solid that is soluble in organic solvents. The complex is used as a precursor to other iridium complexes, some of which are used in homogeneous catalysis.

The compound is prepared by treating cyclooctadiene iridium chloride dimer with sodium methoxide. In terms of its molecular structure, the iridium centers are square planar as is typical for a d^{8} complex. The Ir_{2}O_{2} core is folded.

An example of where this catalyst was used is in the synthesis of doravirine.
