= Bis(pinacolato)diboron =

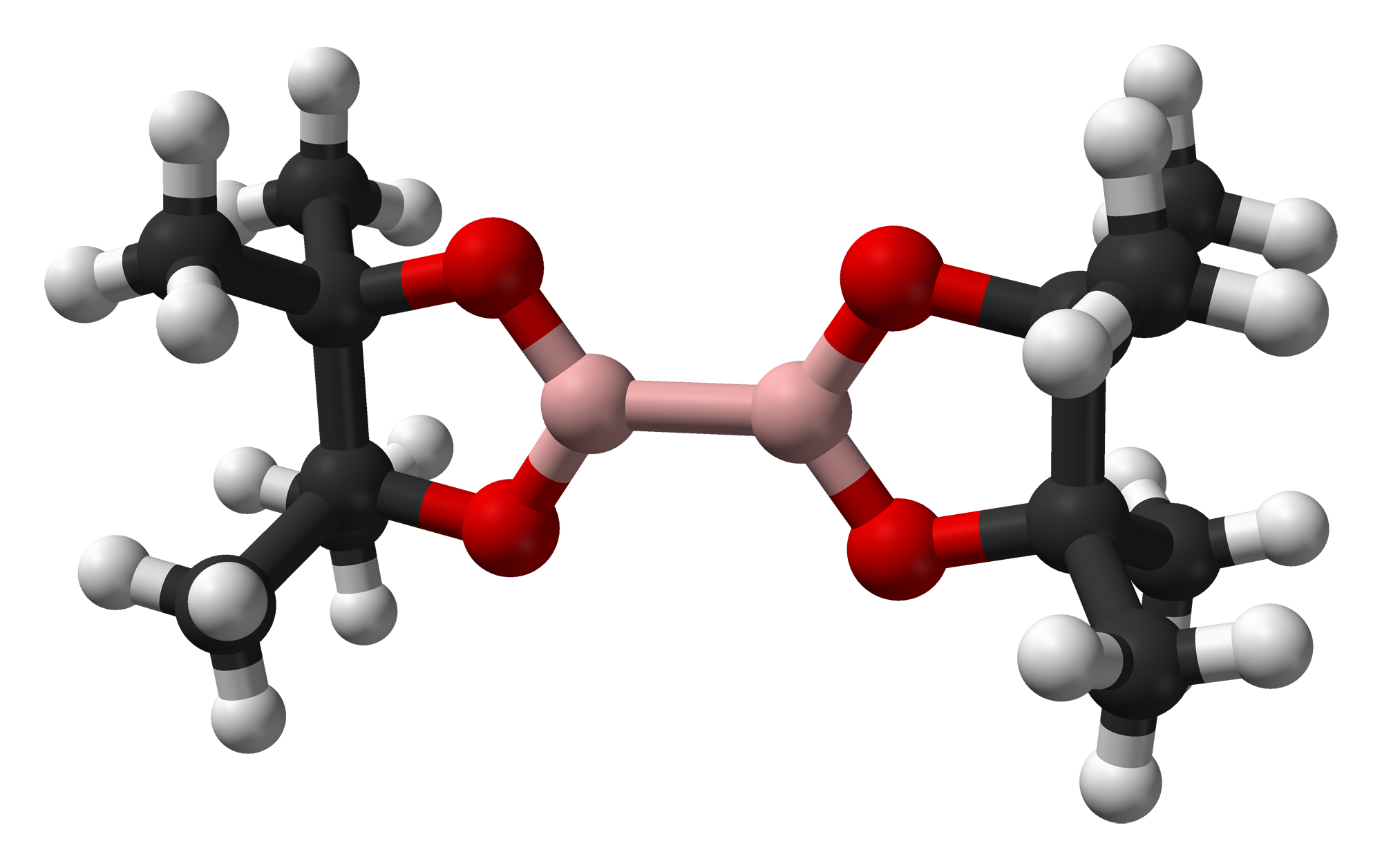

Names
- Preferred IUPAC name Octamethyl-2,2′-bi-1,3,2-dioxaborolane

Identifiers
CAS Number	73183-34-3
3D model (JSmol)	Interactive image
Abbreviations	B_{2}pin_{2}
ChEBI	CHEBI:183312
ChemSpider	2015334
ECHA InfoCard	100.111.245
PubChem CID	2733548
UNII	I906W26P4U
CompTox Dashboard (EPA)	DTXSID30369935
- InChI: InChI=1S/C12H24B2O4/c1-9(2)10(3,4)16-13(15-9)14-17-11(5,6)12(7,8)18-14/h1-8H3 Key: IPWKHHSGDUIRAH-UHFFFAOYSA-N; InChI=1/C12H24B2O4/c1-9(2)10(3,4)16-13(15-9)14-17-11(5,6)12(7,8)18-14/h1-8H3 Key: IPWKHHSGDUIRAH-UHFFFAOYAV
- SMILES: B1(OC(C(O1)(C)C)(C)C)B2OC(C(O2)(C)C)(C)C

Properties
Chemical formula	C_{12}H_{24}B_{2}O_{4}
Molar mass	253.94 g·mol^{−1}
Melting point	137 to 140 °C (279 to 284 °F; 410 to 413 K)
- Except where otherwise noted, data are given for materials in their standard state (at 25 °C [77 °F], 100 kPa). verify (what is ?) Infobox references

Bis(pinacolato)diboron is a covalent compound containing two boron atoms and two pinacolato ligands. It has the formula [(CH_{3})_{4}C_{2}O_{2}B]_{2}; the pinacol groups are sometimes abbreviated as "pin", so the structure is sometimes represented as B_{2}pin_{2}. It is a colourless solid that is soluble in organic solvents. It is a commercially available reagent for making pinacol boronic esters for organic synthesis. Unlike some other diboron compounds, B_{2}pin_{2} is not moisture-sensitive and can be handled in air.

== Preparation and structure ==
This compound may be prepared by treating tetrakis(dimethylamino)diboron with pinacol in acidic conditions. The B-B bond length is 1.711(6) Å.

Dehydrogenation of pinacolborane provides an alternative route:

2 (CH_{3})_{4}C_{2}O_{2}BH → (CH_{3})_{4}C_{2}O_{2}B-BO_{2}C_{2}(CH_{3})_{4} + H_{2}

== Reactions ==
Pinacolborane is a closely related reagent.

The B-B bond adds across alkenes and alkynes to give the 1,2-diborylated alkanes and alkenes. Using various organorhodium or organoiridium catalysts, it can also be installed onto saturated hydrocarbons:

CH_{3}(CH_{2})_{6}CH_{3} + [pinB]_{2} → pinBH + CH_{3}(CH_{2})_{7}Bpin

These reactions proceed via boryl complexes. Bis(pinacolato)diboron can also be used as reducing agent for example in transition metal catalyzed hydrogenations of alkenes and alkynes.
