= Islatravir =

Clinical data
- Pronunciation: /ɪsˈlætrəvɪər/ is-LAT-rə-veer
- Trade names: Idvynso (in combination with doravirine)
- Other names: EFdA; MK-8591; 4′-Ethynyl-2-fluoro-2′-deoxyadenosine; (2R,3S,5R)-5-(6-Amino-2-fluoro-9H-purin-9-yl)-2-ethynyl-2-(hydroxymethyl)oxolan-3-ol
- Routes of administration: By mouth
- Drug class: Nucleoside reverse transcriptase translocation inhibitor (NRTTI)

Legal status
- Legal status: US: ℞-only

Pharmacokinetic data
- Metabolism: Limited; intracellular phosphorylation to active metabolite (ISL-TP)
- Elimination half-life: ~50–60 hours (parent drug)
- Excretion: Renal

Identifiers
- IUPAC name: 2′-Deoxy-4′-C-ethynyl-2-fluoroadenosine
- CAS Number: 865363-93-5
- PubChem CID: 6483431
- DrugBank: DB15653
- ChemSpider: 4983885
- UNII: QPQ082R25D
- KEGG: D11432
- CompTox Dashboard (EPA): DTXSID601046407

Chemical and physical data
- Formula: C_{12}H_{12}FN_{5}O_{3}
- Molar mass: 293.258 g·mol^{−1}
- 3D model (JSmol): Interactive image
- SMILES: C#C[C@]1([C@H](C[C@@H](O1)n2cnc3c2nc(nc3N)F)O)CO
- InChI: InChI=1S/C12H12FN5O3/c1-2-12(4-19)6(20)3-7(21-12)18-5-15-8-9(14)16-11(13)17-10(8)18/h1,5-7,19-20H,3-4H2,(H2,14,16,17)/t6-,7+,12+/m0/s1; Key:IKKXOSBHLYMWAE-QRPMWFLTSA-N

Islatravir (ISL) is an antiretroviral drug used, in fixed-dose combination with doravirine, as a switch regimen for the treatment of HIV-1 infection in adults. The combination, marketed as Idvynso, was approved by the FDA in April 2026. It is classified as a nucleoside reverse transcriptase translocation inhibitor (NRTTI).

== Medical uses ==
The fixed-dose combination of doravirine and islatravir is indicated as a complete regimen for the treatment of HIV-1 infection in adults, to replace current antiretroviral therapy in those who are virologically suppressed, defined as HIV-1 RNA less than 50 copies/mL, on a stable antiretroviral regimen, with no history of virologic treatment failure and no known substitutions associated with resistance to doravirine.

== History ==
In 2021, the FDA placed clinical holds on several studies of islatravir after decreases in total lymphocyte and CD4^{+} T-cell counts were observed in some participants receiving the drug.

Development was subsequently resumed using a lower-dose once-daily oral regimen combining doravirine with islatravir, while development of once-monthly oral islatravir for pre-exposure prophylaxis (PrEP) was discontinued.

In April 2026, the lower-dose doravirine/islatravir combination was approved by the FDA as Idvynso.

== Biological activity ==
Islatravir was originally described as a 4′-modified nucleoside analogue active against drug-resistant HIV-1 variants.

Islatravir has potent activity against HIV-1 in vitro and in animal models, including humanized mice and non-human primates. It demonstrates high potency against both wild-type and drug-resistant HIV-1 strains and has a high genetic barrier to resistance.

== Mechanism of action ==
Islatravir is a nucleoside reverse transcriptase translocation inhibitor (NRTTI). Like other nucleoside reverse transcriptase inhibitors, it must first be converted inside cells to an active triphosphate metabolite, islatravir triphosphate (ISL-TP). HIV-1 reverse transcriptase (RT) then incorporates ISL-TP into nascent viral DNA in place of deoxyadenosine triphosphate.

Islatravir differs from conventional nucleoside and nucleotide reverse transcriptase inhibitors in that it retains a 3′-hydroxyl group. Despite this, its incorporation usually prevents efficient continuation of DNA synthesis. The main mechanism is defective translocation: after islatravir is incorporated at the primer terminus, RT has difficulty moving the primer from the pre-translocation nucleotide-binding site (N-site) to the post-translocation primer site (P-site), thereby preventing addition of the next nucleotide.

Depending on the template sequence, islatravir can act as either an immediate or a delayed chain terminator. If translocation is blocked immediately after incorporation, DNA synthesis stops at that point. If translocation occurs, RT may add one more nucleotide, but further elongation is then blocked because the islatravir-containing primer terminus becomes distorted, creating steric clashes with the incoming nucleotide in the polymerase active site.

Structural studies indicate that this behavior is largely explained by the 4′-ethynyl group of islatravir. The group fits into a conserved hydrophobic pocket in the polymerase active site of RT, forming interactions with amino acid residues. These interactions stabilize the pre-translocation complex and make the post-translocation state less favorable.

RT can also misincorporate islatravir opposite non-canonical template bases. The resulting mismatched primer termini are inefficiently extended and are relatively resistant to phosphorolytic excision. These additional mechanisms, together with impaired translocation, contribute to the high potency of islatravir against wild-type and drug-resistant HIV-1 variants.

== Research ==
A once-weekly oral regimen combining islatravir with the capsid inhibitor lenacapavir is in Phase 3 clinical development as a potential long-acting treatment option for HIV-1 infection. In 2024, Phase 2 data indicated that switching to the islatravir/lenacapavir regimen maintained viral suppression in adults with HIV-1. In June 2026, Gilead Sciences and Merck announced positive topline results from the Phase 3 ISLEND-1 and ISLEND-2 trials of once-weekly islatravir/lenacapavir in virologically suppressed adults with HIV-1. The regimen met the Week 48 primary efficacy endpoint in both trials and was statistically non-inferior to B/F/TAF in ISLEND-1 and to standard-of-care daily oral antiretroviral therapy in ISLEND-2. No new safety concerns were identified, and the companies said they planned to submit the data to regulatory authorities globally.

Islatravir is also being studied in combination with the investigational non-nucleoside reverse transcriptase inhibitor ulonivirine (MK-8507) as a once-weekly oral regimen in Phase 2b trials.
