= Doravirine =

Chemical compound

Clinical data
- Trade names: Pifeltro
- Other names: MK-1439
- AHFS/Drugs.com: Monograph
- MedlinePlus: a618048
- License data: US DailyMed: Doravirine
- Routes of administration: By mouth
- ATC code: J05AG06 (WHO)

Legal status
- Legal status: AU: S4 (Prescription only); CA: ℞-only; UK: POM (Prescription only); US: ℞-only; EU: Rx-only

Identifiers
- IUPAC name: 3-Chloro-5-({1-[(4-methyl-5-oxo-4,5-dihydro-1H-1,2,4-triazol-3-yl)methyl]-2-oxo-4-(trifluoromethyl)-1,2-dihydro-3-pyridinyl}oxy)benzonitrile
- CAS Number: 1338225-97-0
- PubChem CID: 58460047
- DrugBank: DB12301
- ChemSpider: 28424197
- UNII: 913P6LK81M
- KEGG: D10624
- ChEMBL: ChEMBL2364608
- PDB ligand: 2KW (PDBe, RCSB PDB)
- CompTox Dashboard (EPA): DTXSID30158386
- ECHA InfoCard: 100.234.454

Chemical and physical data
- Formula: C_{17}H_{11}ClF_{3}N_{5}O_{3}
- Molar mass: 425.75 g·mol^{−1}
- 3D model (JSmol): Interactive image
- SMILES: Cn1c(n[nH]c1=O)Cn2ccc(c(c2=O)Oc3cc(cc(c3)Cl)C#N)C(F)(F)F
- InChI: InChI=1S/C17H11ClF3N5O3/c1-25-13(23-24-16(25)28)8-26-3-2-12(17(19,20)21)14(15(26)27)29-11-5-9(7-22)4-10(18)6-11/h2-6H,8H2,1H3,(H,24,28); Key:ZIAOVIPSKUPPQW-UHFFFAOYSA-N

Doravirine, sold under the brand name Pifeltro, is a medication used in the treatment of HIV/AIDS. It is a non-nucleoside reverse transcriptase inhibitor developed by Merck.

Doravirine was approved for medical use in the United States in August 2018.

Doravirine is available in fixed-dose combinations with other HIV drugs such as doravirine/lamivudine/tenofovir (sold under the brand name Delstrigo).

== Synthesis ==
A kilogram scale synthesis of doravirine was reported:

skin-invert-image

A reaction catalyzed with cyclooctadiene iridium methoxide dimer and bis(pinacolato)diboron followed by treatment with ozone converted 1-chloro-3-iodobenzene [625-99-0] (1) to 3-chloro-5-iodophenol [861347-86-6] (2). A SNAr reaction with 2-chloro-3-fluoro-4-(trifluoromethyl)pyridine [628692-22-8] (3) led to diaryl ether, 2-chloro-3-(3-chloro-5-iodophenoxy)-4-(trifluoromethyl)pyridine [1338226-06-4] (4). Basic hydrolysis followed by recrystallization gave rise to 2-pyridinol, PC58460051 (5). Introduction of the nitrile functional group using copper cyanide in NMP was achieved under relatively mild conditions. Keeping the temperature under 110 °C was critical for suppressing undesired bis-cyanation products, and that the iodide was chosen over the analogous bromide to further help ensure selectivity for the desired mono-nitrile product, PC58460048 (6). Alkylation with 5-(Chloromethyl)-2,4-dihydro-4-methyl-3H-1,2,4-triazol-3-one [1338226-21-3] (7) was possible under mild conditions to give 2-pyridone [1338226-05-3] (8). Temperature controlled alkylation with iodomethane and potassium carbonate completed the synthesis of doravirine (9).
