= 9-Borafluorene =

Class of chemical compounds

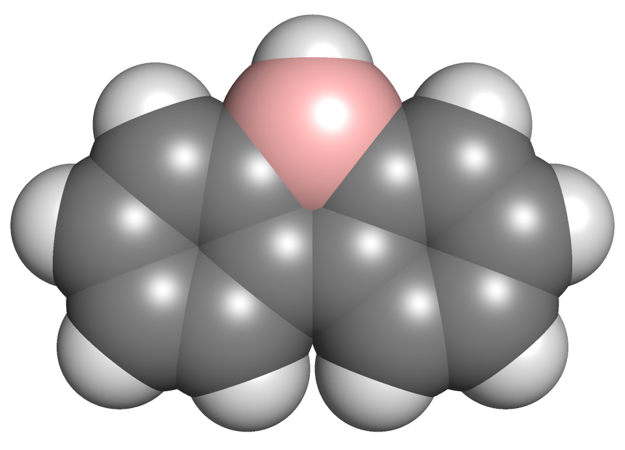

Identifiers
CAS Number	244-33-7
3D model (JSmol)	Interactive image
PubChem CID	91865978
- InChI: InChI=1S/C12H9B/c1-3-7-11-9(5-1)10-6-2-4-8-12(10)13-11/h1-8,13H Key: PGFVYIIJNFGCFU-UHFFFAOYSA-N
- SMILES: B1C2=CC=CC=C2C3=CC=CC=C31

Properties
Chemical formula	C_{12}H_{9}B
Molar mass	164.01 g·mol^{−1}
- Except where otherwise noted, data are given for materials in their standard state (at 25 °C [77 °F], 100 kPa). Infobox references

9-Borafluorenes are a class of boron-containing heterocycles consisting of a tricyclic system with a central BC_{4} ring with two fused arene groups. 9-Borafluorenes can be thought of as a borole with two fused arene rings, or as a trigonal planar boron atom with an empty p orbital bridging two biphenyl rings. However, 9-borafluorenes are generally less reactive than boroles due to less antiaromatic character and Lewis acidity. Containing highly conjugated π systems, 9-borafluorenes possess interesting photophysical properties. In addition, 9-borafluorenes are good Lewis acids. This combination of properties enables potential uses such as in light-emitting materials, solar cells, and sensors for some molecules.

== Synthesis ==
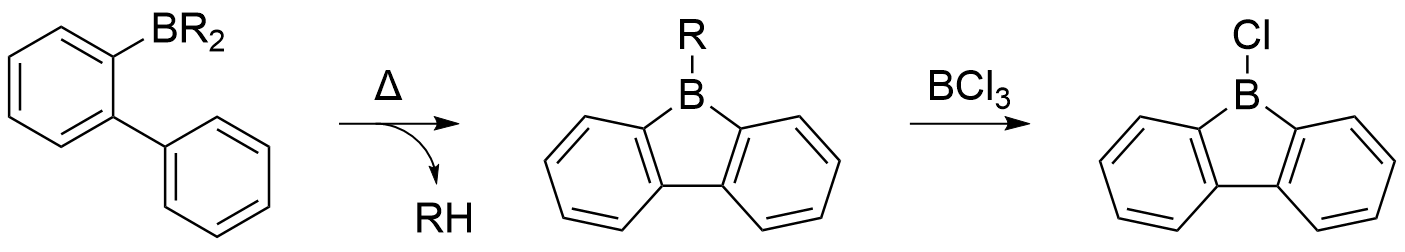
Thermolysis of dialkyl or diaryl-2-biphenylboranes to yield 9-borafluorene. (R = Et, ^{n}Pr, ^{i}Bu, Ph)

The earliest successful synthesis of a 9-borafluorene was reported in 1963 by Köster and Benedikt, who performed thermolysis of dialkyl- or diaryl-2-biphenylboranes to release an alkane and yield the 9-borafluorene. Treatment of the resulting 9-alkyl or 9-arylborafluorene with boron trichloride yields the 9-chloroborafluorene, which can be functionalized to a variety of derivatives.

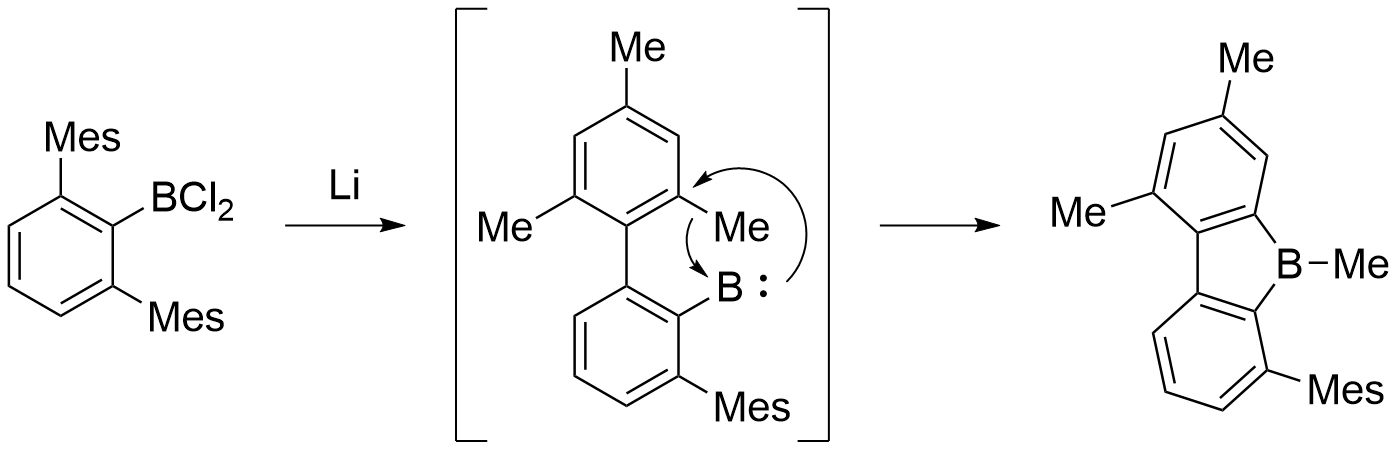
Formation of a reactive borylene intermediate by treatment of 2,6-Mes_{2}C_{6}H_{3}BCl_{2} (Mes = 2,4,6-trimethylphenyl) with lithium metal, followed by C–C σ bond insertion to yield the 9-borafluorene.

A particularly interesting synthesis of 9-borafluorenes was reported by Grigsby and Power. 2,6-Mes_{2}C_{6}H_{3}BX_{2} (X = Cl, Br) was treated with lithium metal in diethyl ether to yield the reactive, highly electron-deficient borylene intermediate, which is able to insert into the strong C–C σ bond to form a 9-borafluorene.

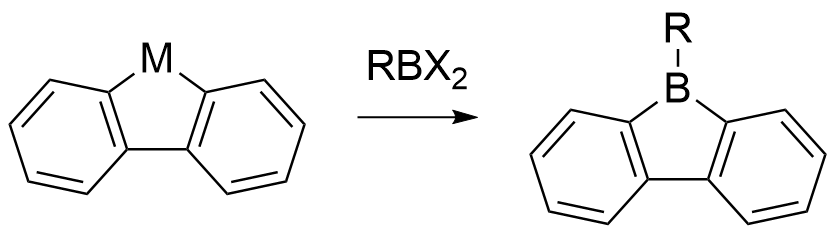
Synthetic route to 9-borafluorenes using transmetalation reactions. Successful synthesis of 9-borafluorene derivatives have been performed with M=Mg, Hg, SnR_{2}, SiMe_{2}.

A highly useful synthetic route to 9-borafluorenes is transmetalation reactions that utilize a heteroatom in the 9-position. 9-mercurafluorenes, 9-silafluorenes, and 9-stannafluorenes have been utilized in syntheses with generally good yield. While earlier synthetic methods often suffered from some substituents on the biphenyl framework leading to poor yield and selectivity, transmetalation methods generally tolerate substitution, giving rise to greater variety.

=== Functionalization ===
9-Halo-9-borafluorenes are by far the most common precursors to functionalization of 9-borafluorenes at the boron center. The main strategies to accomplish late-stage functionalization at the boron center are metal halide elimination reactions using organometallic reagents, trialkylsilyl halide elimination, and hydrogen halide elimination using a base and either an amine or alcohol.

== Reactivity ==
=== Lewis acid-base adducts ===
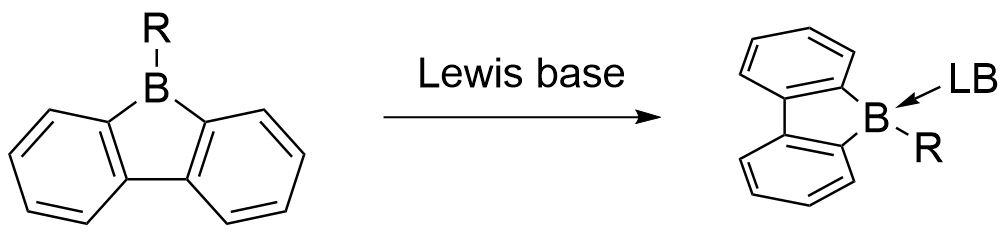
Lewis base (LB) adduct to 9-borafluorene (R = Cl, Br, OTf, Ph).

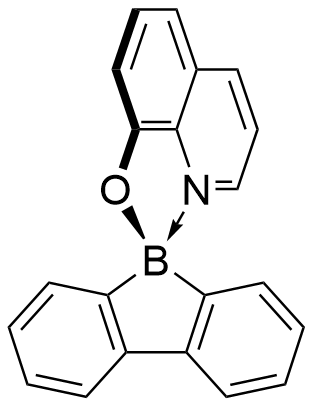
Intramolecular Lewis acid-base adduct of a 9-borafluorene.

9-Borafluorenes are highly Lewis acidic at the boron center and readily form Lewis acid-base adducts to satisfy the octet for the boron atom. In these adducts, the boron center is no longer trigonal planar and no longer has its empty p orbital that participates in conjugation in the π system in 9-borafluorene. Adducts involving Lewis bases such as pyridines, phosphines, ethers, carbenes, and nitriles have been described. The reactions involve simple reaction of the 9-borafluorene with the Lewis base at room temperature or low temperature in moderate to high yield. In addition, 9-borafluorenes whose boron is substituted with a group that also contains a Lewis base, such as 8-hydroxyquinioline, can form intramolecular adducts via the substituent's Lewis base donating to the boron atom to form a boron spirocenter.

=== Reduction ===
The 4π antiaromatic BC_{4} ring can undergo two-electron reduction to form a 6π aromatic system to form a dianion.

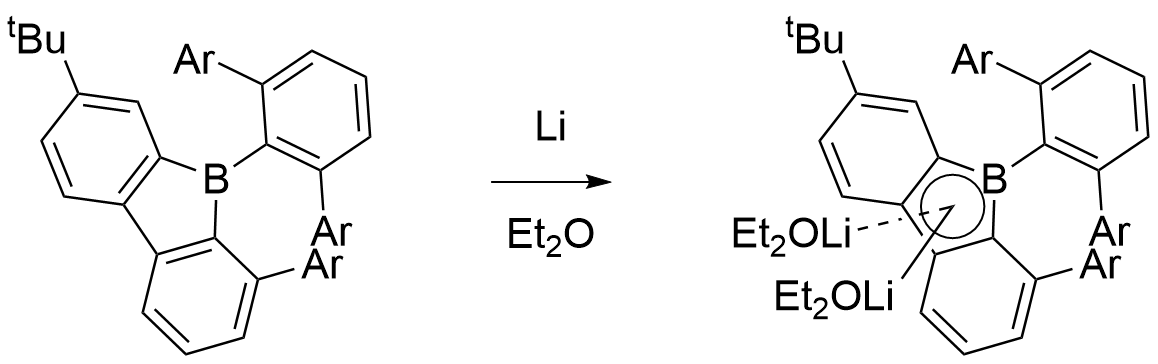
Reduction of a 9-borafluorene by lithium metal (Ar = 4-^{t}Bu-C_{6}H_{4}).

This can be accomplished by reduction by lithium metal. X-ray diffraction studies show that upon reduction, the B–C bond shortens from 1.64 Å to 1.54 Å owing to the gain of aromaticity. One-electron reduction of 9-bromo-9-borafluorene NHC and CAAC adducts has also yielded isolable neutral 9-borafluorene radicals.

=== B–C bond insertion ===
The endocyclic B–C bond in 9-borafluorenes is often susceptible to insertion by a variety of reagents.

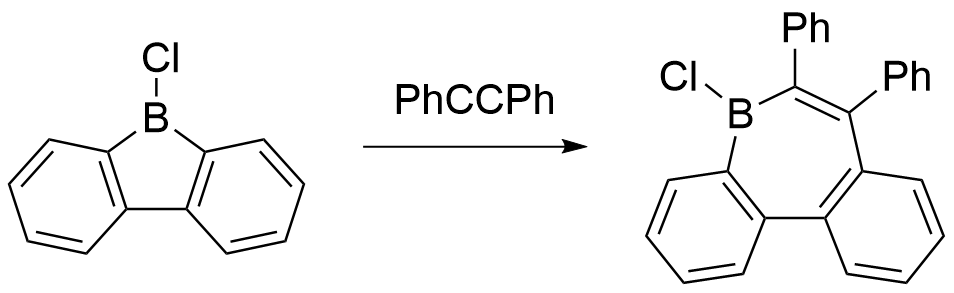
Insertion of diphenylacetylene into 9-chloro-9-borafluorene. The same reaction has been performed for the bromine and triflate derivatives.

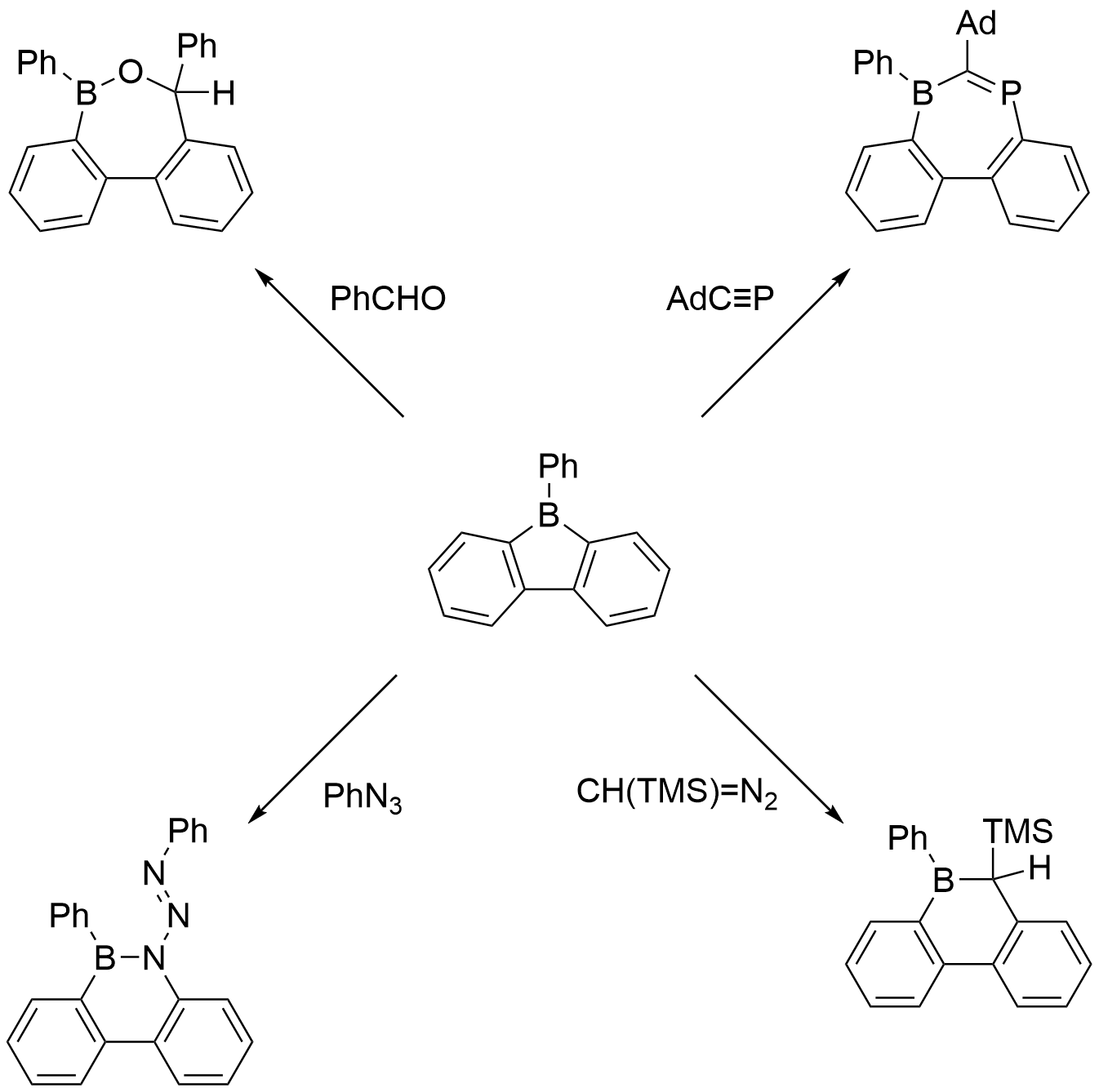
Azide, carbene, carbonyl, and phosphaalkyne insertion reactions for 9-phenyl-9-borafluorene. (Ad = adamantyl)

Alkynes and phosphaalkynes have been shown to insert into the B–C bond to yield a 7-membered ring system. Mechanistic calculations revealed that the reaction between diphenylacetylene and 9-chloro-9-borafluorene occurs first by coordination of the alkyne π bond to the boron center, followed by insertion into the B–C bond in a concerted step with a single transition state to yield the BC_{6} system. In contrast, mechanistic calculations indicate that the reaction of 1-adamantyl-phosphaalkyne and 9-phenyl-9-borafluorene occurs via a concerted transition state.

Carbenes have also been shown to perform insertion. Bartholeme, Bluer, and Martin reacted 9-phenyl-9-borafluorene with CH(TMS)=N_{2} which generates a carbene via loss of N_{2}. Insertion generated a BC_{5} system, which could then undergo a subsequent insertion with another equivalent of the carbene to yield a symmetric species with a BC_{6} system.

In addition to alkynes, phosphaalkynes, and carbenes, insertion reactions into 9-borafluorenes have been shown with other functional groups such as azides and carbonyls.

=== Metal complexes ===
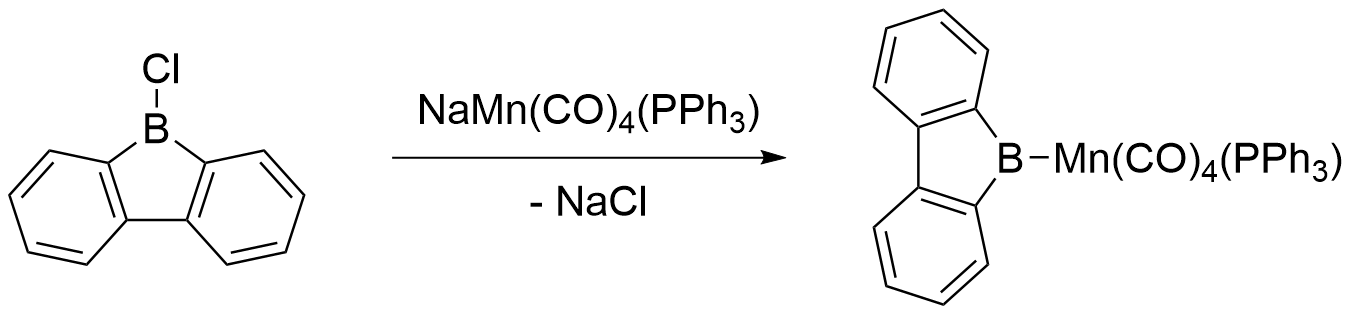
Synthesis of metal-boryl 9-borafluorene complex with Mn(I) by reaction of 9-chloro-9-borafluorene and NaMn(CO)_{4}(PPh_{3}).

Transition metal complexes involving 9-borafluorenes include those in which the 9-borafluorene acts as an L-type ligand similar to a metal-boryl complex. These were the earliest 9-borafluorene complexes to be synthesized, and usually involved reaction of 9-chloro-9-borafluorene with alkali metal salts of anionic transition metal complexes, such as Mn(-I). Upon reaction, the alkali metal chloride is eliminated and the transition metal undergoes two-electron oxidation to yield the metal-boryl complex. Such complexes are essentially metal-boryl complexes, in which the 9-borafluorene ligand acts as a σ donor and π acceptor. (Co(II), and Co(III) complexes of this type have also been synthesized.)

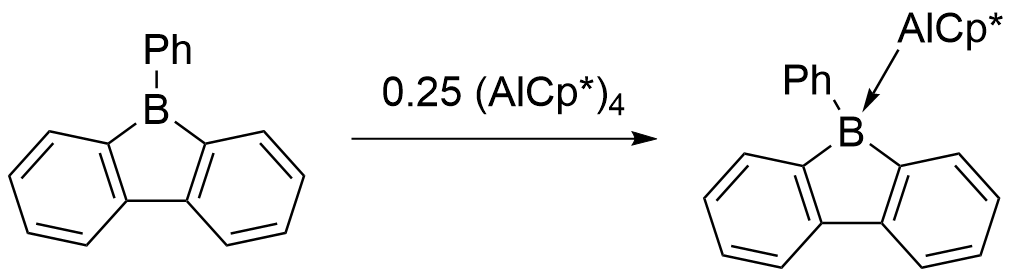
Reaction of 9-phenyl-9-borafluorene with the AlCp* tetramer to yield the η^{1} 9-borafluorene complex, with boron acting as the acceptor.

η^{1} complexes in which the 9-borafluorene acts as a Z-type ligand accepting the metal center's electrons into the empty boron p orbital have been synthesized, including the complex between 9-alkyl- or 9-aryl-9-borafluorenes and (pentamethylcyclopentadienyl)aluminium(I) (AlCp*) in which the aluminium center donates into the empty boron p orbital.

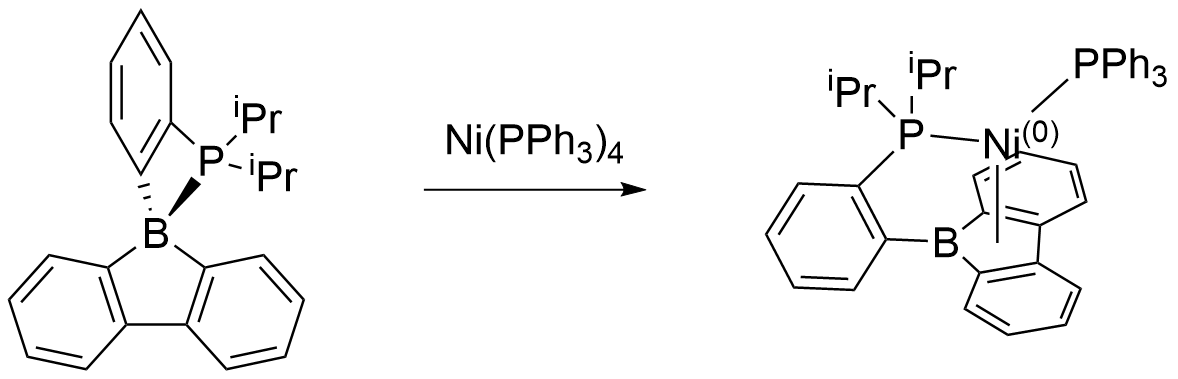
Successful synthesis of an η^{5} 9-borafluorene-nickel complex.

Attempts to synthesize η^{5} 9-borafluorene complexes with aluminium(III) were unsuccessful, but an η^{5} complex with Ni(0) was synthesized by Harman et al. by reaction of a phosphine-appended 9-borafluorene ligand with tetrakis(triphenylphosphine)nickel. X-ray diffraction studies of the resulting product showed Ni–C distances that indicated interaction between the nickel atom and the carbon atoms in the central BC_{4} ring. DFT calculations led the authors to describe the borafluorene complex as an L_{2} ligand with significant nickel backbonding into the empty boron p orbital.

=== Oligomerizations ===
9-Borafluorenes can participate in ring-opening reactions to form oligomers, which often contain three-center two-electron bonds, in order to fulfill the octet on the boron atom. For example, it has been reported that a 1:1 mixture of 9-bromo-9-borafluorene and triethylsilane at room temperature for several weeks led to a pentameric species as a result of a ring-opening reaction. However, the same reaction under high temperature yielded the dimer.

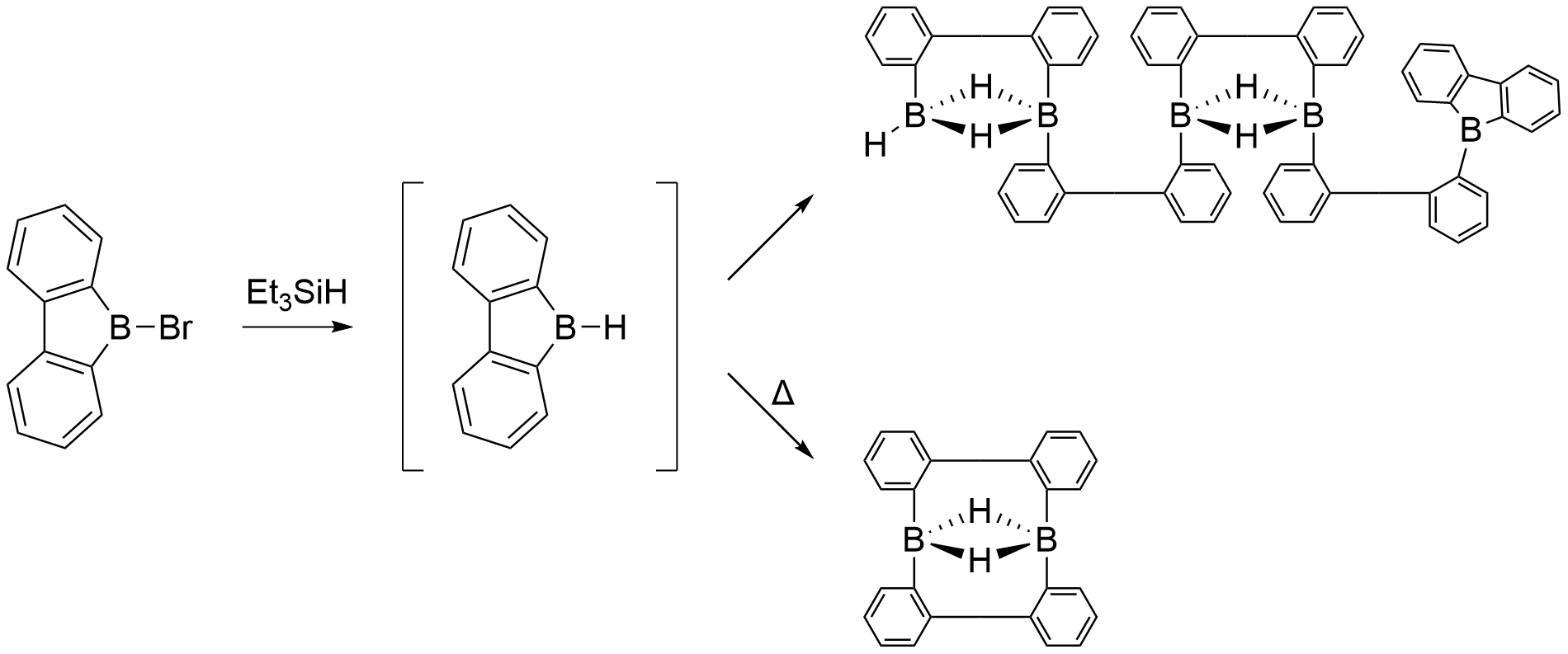
Oligomerization reactions of 9-H-9-borafluorene following its synthesis by treatment of 9-bromo-9-borafluorene by triethylsilane. The pentamer converts to the dimer under heating.

== Properties ==
=== Photophysical properties ===
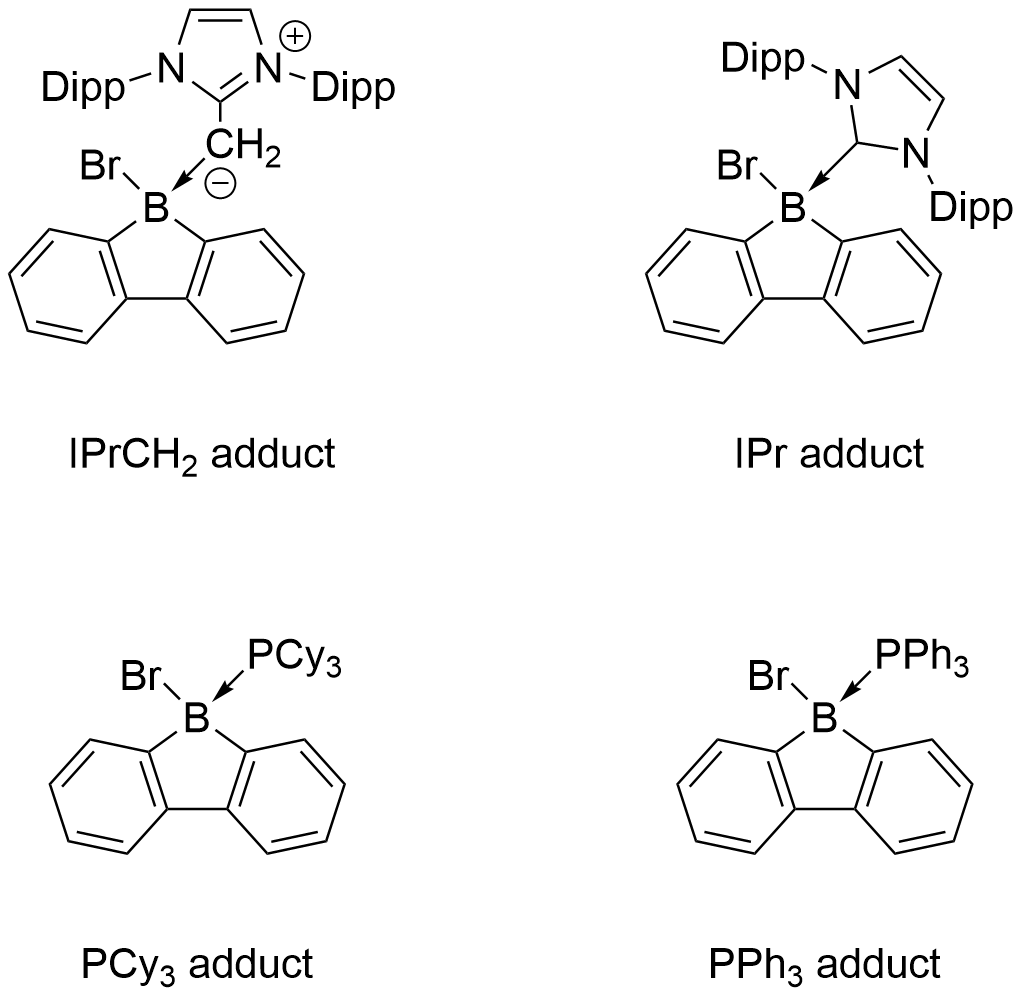
Adducts of 9-borafluorene which all fluoresce at λ=435 nm.

The presence of π-conjugation throughout the biphenyl unit and the empty p orbital of 9-borafluorenes leads to interesting properties such as fluorescence. For example, IPr ((HCNDipp)_{2}C:), IPrCH_{2} ((HCNDipp)_{2}C=CH_{2}), PCy_{3}, and PPh_{3} monoadducts of 9-bromo-9-borafluorene displayed blue emission peaks at λ=435 nm, suggesting that the fluorescence arises from the 9-borafluorene scaffold and that the identity of the Lewis base coordinating the boron center does not alter the fluorescent properties. However, 9-borafluorenes with substituents possessing an additional Lewis basic functional group, such as 8-hydroxyquinoline, show higher quantum yield due to increased rigidity of the molecule. A similar phenomenon was observed with BODIPY and aza-BODIPY coordinating to the boron center, where the HOMO–LUMO gaps of each π system were relatively unchanged, but increased rigidity led to improved quantum yield.

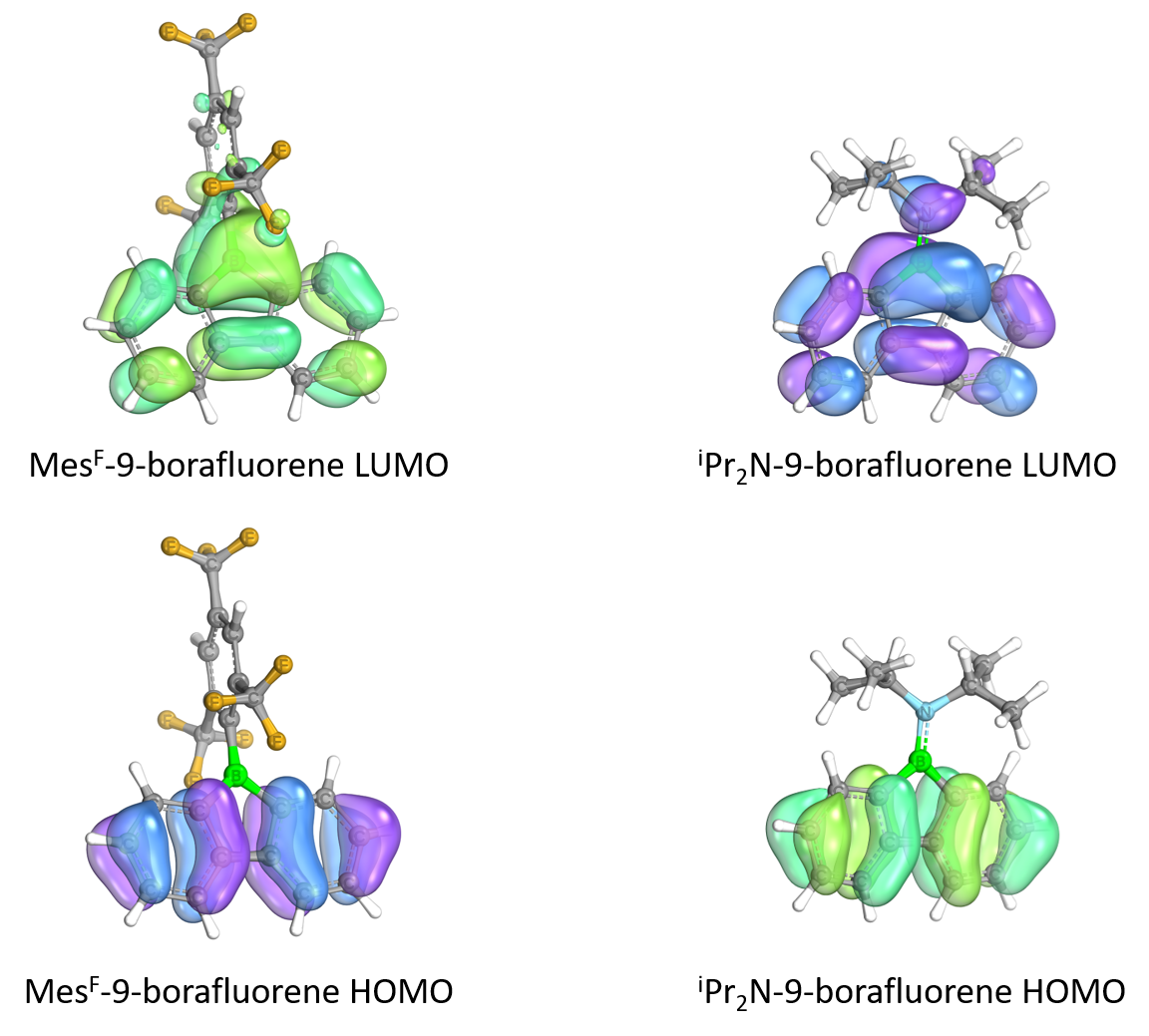
Frontier molecular orbitals of Mes^{F}-9-borafluorene and ^{i}Pr_{2}N-9-borafluorene calculated at a B3LYP/6-31+G(d) level.

While the identity of the Lewis base in the 9-borafluorene adduct does not affect the emission, the identity of the substituent at the boron center have been found to affect photophysical properties. π donor groups such as ^{t}BuO and ^{i}Pr_{2}N were found to blue-shift the absorption peak attributed to raising the energy of the LUMO, while electron acceptor groups such as Mes^{F} (2,4,6-(tris(trifluoromethyl))phenyl) were found to red-shift the absorption by lowering the energy of the LUMO. Computational studies have been performed and have calculated that the while the HOMOs of the Mes^{F} and ^{i}Pr_{2}N substituted 9-borafluorenes have energies -6.37 and -5.85 eV, the LUMOs have energies -2.77 and -1.68 eV. The bonding interaction of Mes^{F} and the antibonding interaction of ^{i}Pr_{2}N with the LUMO are visualized with the frontier molecular orbitals above, explaining the trends in LUMO energy. The HOMO has a small contribution from the boron atom and is thus affected relatively little by the substituent.

=== Sensors ===
Though the identity of the Lewis base in adducts does not affect emission, the change in hybridization of the boron center upon adduct formation alters the π system of 9-borafluorenes. The combination of the photophysical properties and Lewis acidities enables 9-borafluorenes to have potential applications as molecular sensors.

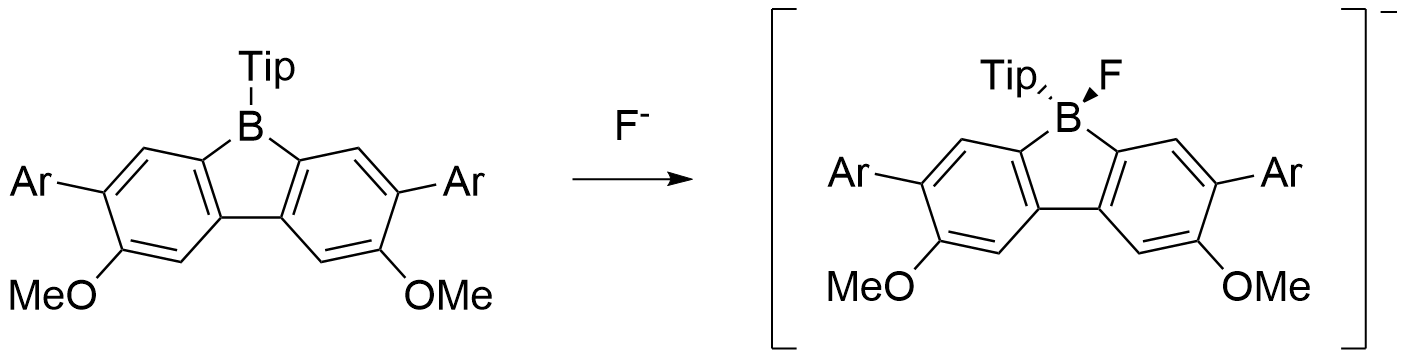
Fluoride sensor whose emission maximum is ~140 nm blue shifted upon fluoride binding. (Ar = 4-(Ph_{2}N)-C_{6}H_{4}, 2-thienyl, 2-bithienyl)

Yamaguchi et al. investigated an early 9-borafluorene sensor for fluoride ion using fluorescent properties, observing that THF solutions of the sensor possessed an emission maximum of around 560 nm, whereas upon addition of fluoride ion using TBAF the 560 nm peak disappeared and an emission maximum around 420 nm appeared. In addition, adding a strong fluoride scavenger such as BF_{3}•OEt_{2} reversed the changes. The sensing was attributed to the binding of fluoride ion increasing the HOMO-LUMO gap by changing the p_{π}-π* conjugation.

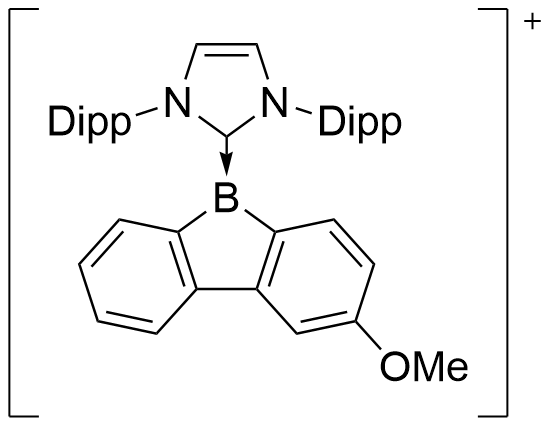
NHC-stabilized 9-borafluorenium cation that displays thermochromism.

Another sensor, an NHC-stabilized 3-methoxy-9-borafluorenium cation, displays thermochromism based on intermolecular coordination of the oxygen atom in the methoxy group of one molecule to a boron center in another molecule. It was observed that a solution of the sensor in a weakly coordinating solvent was red at room temperature but became colorless upon cooling.

A variety of other 9-borafluorene-based sensors have been developed, including those using 9-borafluorene copolymers, those sensing species such as ammonia, and those sensing alkane solvent chain length by utilizing solvatochromism.
