= Rich Carter =

American chemist (born 1971)

Rich G. Carter (born August 27, 1971, Dallas, Texas) is Professor of Chemistry of the Department of Chemistry at Oregon State University. His research fields are synthetic organic chemistry in general and natural product synthesis. He is also the co-founder and CEO of a chemical manufacturing company Valliscor.

== Biography ==
Carter attended Gettysburg College for his undergraduate studies and the University of Texas at Austin for graduate school, earning his Ph.D. in 1997 under the tutelage of Professor Philip Magnus. He subsequently joined the laboratory of James D. White at OSU, as an NIH Postdoctoral Fellow. He was a faculty member at the University of Mississippi before relocating to Corvallis, Oregon in 2002.
