= RECOVERY Trial =

Test of existing medicines on COVID-19

RECOVERY Trial logo

The Randomised Evaluation of COVID-19 Therapy (RECOVERY Trial) is a large-enrollment clinical trial of possible treatments for people in the United Kingdom admitted to hospital with severe COVID-19 infection. The trial was later expanded to Indonesia, Nepal and Vietnam. The trial has tested ten interventions on adults: eight repurposed drugs, one newly developed drug and convalescent plasma.

== Overview ==
The RECOVERY Trial is a large-scale, randomized controlled trial. It is an "open label" study: people receiving the treatment and the attending clinicians both know which treatment is being administered. It is a multi-arm adaptive clinical trial, meaning that new treatments can be added into the trial as it progresses, and other treatment "arms" closed to new enrolment when results have been produced.

The very fast setting up of the trial was crucial for the fast-developing COVID-19 pandemic. Martin Landray, one of the trial's creators, said in March 2021 "I think it has set a new standard for what can be delivered and not just for pandemics. It would be a travesty if we went back to a situation where it takes years sometimes to get a trial off the ground."

=== Enrollment ===
When people who have been hospitalised with COVID-19 are enrolled in the trial, they are automatically randomized to receive trial treatments. If any treatment is contra-indicated (or positively indicated) for that patient, or is not available, then that treatment is not included in the randomization process. The main randomization stage has three parts, so that patients might be allocated none, one, two or three of the trial treatments. If their disease progresses, there may also be a second randomization.

=== Goals ===
The primary objective of the trial is to "provide reliable estimates of the effect of study treatments on all-cause mortality at 28 days after first randomization".

The trial protocol was developed in March 2020. The design minimizes the administrative load on hospital staff, who at the time were facing the prospect of overwhelming numbers of COVID-19 admissions.

== Treatments ==
As of 25 June 2021, the following treatments are allocated at random to hospitalized people with severe COVID-19 infection:

- Baricitinib (an immunomodulatory drug used in rheumatoid arthritis)
- Dimethyl fumarate (adults only, early phase assessment)
- Infliximab (adults only)
- High-dose dexamethasone (adults with hypoxia only)

Children with PIMS-TS may also be allocated the following:

- Low-dose dexamethasone (a steroid, which reduces inflammation)
- Intravenous immunoglobulin
- Tocilizumab (an anti-inflammatory)
- Anakinra (an anti-inflammatory)

The following treatments have previously been included in the trial and obtained positive results:

- Low-dose dexamethasone
- Tocilizumab
- REGN-COV2 (a cocktail of two anti-viral monoclonal antibodies)
- Baricitinib

The following treatments have previously been included in the trial and were closed to new entrants after being shown to be ineffective.:

- Lopinavir-Ritonavir (an HIV medication)
- Hydroxychloroquine (used to treat malaria and rheumatism)
- Azithromycin (an antibiotic)
- Convalescent plasma (blood plasma from people who have recovered from COVID-19 and which may contain antibodies against the SARS-CoV-2 virus)
- Aspirin (a commonly used blood thinner)
- Colchicine (a drug used for gout)

== Operations ==
The trial is run by the Nuffield Departments of Population Health and of Medicine at the University of Oxford and supported by the National Institute for Health Research (NIHR). The study is led by Peter Horby and Martin Landray who serve as Co-Chief Investigators of the trial. By July 2020, the trial was in progress at 176 NHS hospitals in the UK, involving many thousands of health professionals.

The trial began in March 2020. As of March 2021 the trial had enrolled more than 40,000 COVID-19 participants admitted to hospitals in the UK; the estimated primary completion date was December 2021, and the estimated study completion date was December 2031.

== Results ==
=== Dexamethasone ===
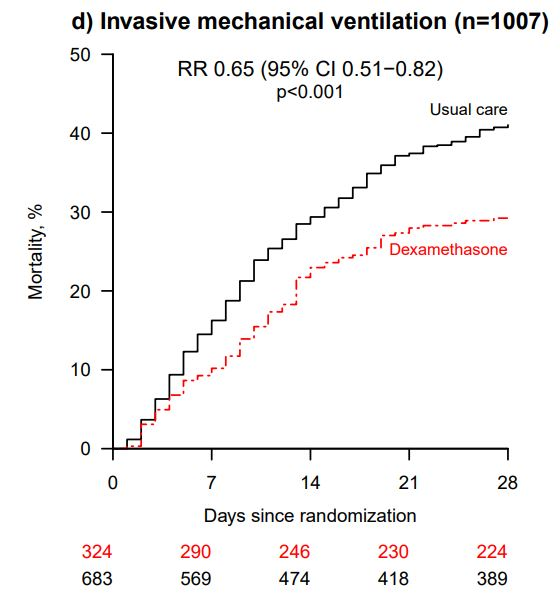
Mortality over 28 days for 1007 COVID-19 patients on mechanical ventilation at time of randomisation: 324 patients who received dexamethasone (red) compared to 683 who received standard hospital care (black)

In June 2020, preliminary results were published in a preprint showing that low-dose dexamethasone treatment reduced the death rate by one third in hospitalized people needing ventilators due to severe COVID-19 infection, and by one fifth in people treated with oxygen therapy. There was no benefit (and the possibility of harm) among people who did not require oxygen. The preliminary report was subsequently published in The New England Journal of Medicine.

==== Impacts ====
Six days before the pre-print, these results had been announced in a news release. A UK Therapeutic Alert was issued the same day, and all the Chief Medical Officers in the United Kingdom exceptionally recommended an immediate change of UK-wide clinical practice, in advance of publication of any final paper.

Demand for dexamethasone surged after publication of the preprint.

Based on the preliminary, unpublished results of the RECOVERY trial, the US National Institutes of Health COVID-19 Treatment Guidelines Panel recommended dexamethasone in patients with COVID-19 who are on mechanical ventilation or those who require supplemental oxygen, and recommended against dexamethasone for those not requiring supplemental oxygen.

Other countries granted specific approval for the drug as part of standard medical care, among them Japan, Taiwan and South Africa.

A pre-print study, which was awarded Health Data Research UK Open Access Publication of the Month for August 2020, found that the discovery would save approximately 650,000 lives globally over the course of six months.

==== Limitations of dexamethasone result ====
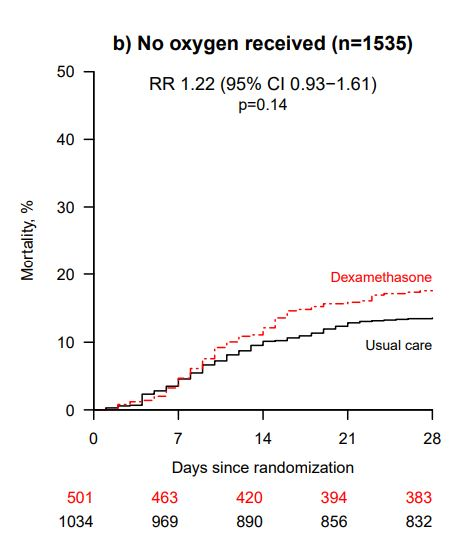
Mortality over 28 days for 1535 COVID-19 patients not receiving oxygen at time of randomisation: 501 patients who received dexamethasone (red) compared to 1034 who received standard hospital care (black)

John Fletcher, research editor at the BMJ, noted that there were "limitations and causes of concern" in the dexamethasone results.

- Around a third of patients in the trial were still in hospital at the end of the 28-day trial period, so their final outcomes were not known.
- As an immunosuppressive drug, there are fears that dexamethasone could make the illness worse, and prolong the infection in patients where the immune system has not yet overreacted and caused inflammation.
- The preprint authors themselves warned that "the results are consistent with possible harm" in patients who did not require oxygen at the time of enrolment. The trial observed a 22% increase in mortality in these patients (rate ratio 1.22 [95% Confidence Interval 0.93 to 1.61]; p=0.14), though this observation may still be due to chance.
- Responding to the publication, the WHO emphasized that dexamethasone should only be used for patients with severe or critical disease, under close clinical supervision, stating that "There is no evidence this drug works for patients with mild disease or as a preventative measure, and it could cause harm."

==== Confirmation of dexamethasone result ====
The results of this initial finding were replicated in a systematic review published in September 2020 by the WHO's Rapid Evidence Appraisal for COVID-19 Therapies (REACT) Working Group.

=== Hydroxychloroquine ===
In June 2020, the trial determined that there was no clinical benefit from use of hydroxychloroquine in people hospitalized with COVID-19.

=== Lopinavir-ritonavir ===
In June 2020, chief investigators of the trial reported there was no clinical benefit from use of lopinavir-ritonavir in 1,596 people hospitalized with severe COVID-19 infection over 28 days of treatment. These results were published in The Lancet on 5 October 2020.

=== Azithromycin ===
In December 2020, the chief investigators announced that they had found no benefit from azithromycin in patients hospitalised with COVID-19. 2582 patients had received azithromycin, and 5182 were randomised to usual care alone. 28-day mortality in both cohorts was 19%. These preliminary results were released as a preprint on the same day.

=== Convalescent plasma ===
In January 2021, the chief investigators announced the closure of the convalescent plasma arm of the trial. Among 1873 reported deaths from 10,405 patients, the trial reported "no significant difference in the primary endpoint of 28-day mortality (18% convalescent plasma vs. 18% usual care alone; risk ratio 1.04 [95% confidence interval 0.95-1.14]; p=0.34)". The article with full results was published on 14 May 2021.

=== Tocilizumab ===
Tocilizumab significantly reduces the risk of death when given to hospitalised patients with severe COVID-19. 2022 patients allocated to Tocilizumab were compared to 2094 who received standard hospital care. "596 (29%) of the patients in the tocilizumab group died within 28 days compared with 694 (33%) patients in the usual care group (rate ratio 0·86; [95% confidence interval [CI] 0·77 to 0·96]; p=0·007), an absolute difference of 4%." Receiving tocilizumab also increased the chance of discharge from hospital within 28 days.

This result supports the earlier findings of the Remap-Cap trial on the effectiveness of Tocilizumab for patients in intensive care, and extends those findings to a wider group of patients.

=== Dimethyl fumarate ===
A study published in January 2024 by the trial's chief investigators found that dimethyl fumarate did not significantly improve clinical outcomes in hospitalized COVID-19 patients.

== See also ==
- Solidarity trial
- PANORAMIC trial
- AGILE trial
- COVID-19 drug development
