= Anthony Gordon (clinical scientist) =

British medical professor

Anthony Christopher Gordon MBE FRCA FMedSci
- Education: St Bartholomew's Hospital Medical School, University of London
- Scientific career
- Fields: Critical Care Sepsis
- Workplaces: Imperial College London
- Thesis: Genetic polymorphisms of the innate immune system: influence on susceptibility and outcome in severe sepsis and septic shock
- Doctoral advisor: Charles Hinds
- Website: www.imperial.ac.uk/people/anthony.gordon

Anthony Gordon MBE FRCA FMedSci is a British clinician scientist and the Chair of Anaesthesia & Critical Care at Imperial College London and works as an intensive care consultant at Imperial College Healthcare NHS Trust.

== Early life and education ==
Educated at Kings College School, Wimbledon, he studied medicine at St Bartholomew's Hospital Medical School, University of London, and was awarded a BSc in Anatomy with Basic Medical Sciences in 1990 and MBBS in 1993. He undertook his doctoral studies with Charles Hinds and was awarded an MD for his thesis exploring genetic polymorphisms in sepsis

== Career and research ==
He undertook his postgraduate medical training in London with an additional year at Royal North Shore Hospital in Sydney, Australia He was awarded the Intensive Care Society visiting fellowship in 2005 and spent two years in Vancouver at St Paul's Hospital, University of British Columbia and also worked as the director of medical development of a university spin-out company (Sirius Genomics Inc) developing pharmacogenetic tests for use in the ICU.

As an NIHR Research Professor (2016-2022) he leads a multi-disciplinary team investigating the use of ‘omic techniques and artificial intelligence (AI) to improve outcomes in sepsis, with a particular focus on clinical trials and translational studies. He was the Chief Investigator of the VANISH clinical trial evaluating early vasopressin use (in combination with hydrocortisone) and the LeoPARDS trial evaluating levosimendan, both in septic shock.

He is the UK Chief Investigator for the REMAP-CAP clinical trial, which was the first trial to demonstrate that the immune modulating drugs, tocilizumab and sarilumab, saved lives from severe COVID-19. The Prime Minister announced this result from 10 Downing Street and Gordon is the first author of the published paper. This adaptive platform trial has reported on more than a dozen other interventions for severe COVID-19, including hydrocortisone, convalescent plasma, anti-virals, anti-platelet drugs, therapeutic heparin, ACE inhibitors and Angiotensin Receptor Blockers (ARBs), high-dose vitamin C and simvastatin. The trial has now been selected by the NIHR as the national platform trial to find the most effective treatments for people hospitalised with severe flu.

In March 2024 he was appointed as Programme Director of the National Research Collaboration Programme (NRCP). The NRCP is an NIHR / NHS England partnership that commissions high quality evidence for treatments where research can present particular challenges and might otherwise not progress. In June 2025 he was appointed as Programme Director of the NIHR's Health Technology Assessment (HTA) programme.

== Honours ==
His contributions to clinical science have been recognised in appointment as a Fellow of the Academy of Medical Sciences (2022), an Honorary Member of the Intensive Care Society and NIHR Senior Investigator (2023). He was appointed as a Member of the Order of the British Empire (MBE) in the 2024 Birthday Honours for services to Critical Care Medicine.
