= PANORAMIC trial =

Clinical trial of antivirals for COVID-19 infection

PANORAMIC
- Study type: platform trial
- Dates: Dec 2021 - ongoing
- Locations: United Kingdom
- Lead researcher: Chris Butler, Paul Little
- Funding: National Institute for Health and Care Research (NIHR)

The PANORAMIC trial (short for Platform Adaptive Trial of Novel Antivirals for Early Treatment of COVID-19 in the Community) is a clinical trial in the United Kingdom testing the effectiveness of new antiviral drugs at the early stages of COVID-19 infections. The study aims to determine if antivirals can prevent death and hospitalisation and help faster recovery for people aged over 50 and those at higher risk due to underlying health conditions. The trial was launched in December 2021, and had nearly 30,000 people enrolled as participants.

== Overview ==
PANORAMIC is a platform trial that compares groups who are having symptoms of COVID: one receives standard care (same as best care in the NHS) and others receive standard care plus antiviral treatment. Participants take part from home online or via phone and the antivirals are delivered to them.

=== Participants ===
People could enroll in the study if they had symptoms of COVID (confirmed by a test) less than 5 days prior to enrolling. They had to be either aged 50 or over, or have a preexisting health condition.

=== Treatments ===
The antivirals tested in the study were molnupiravir (Lagevrio) and nirmatrelvir/ritonavir (Paxlovid).

== Results ==
=== Molnupiravir ===
Results from the trial showed that for higher risk, vaccinated adults molnupiravir does not reduce the chances of hospitalisation and death. However molnupiravir was found to help people recover four days sooner and reduces the amount of virus in the body (viral load). Participants receiving molnupiravir reported feeling better in comparison to those who received usual care.

Even though molnupiravir reduced the amount of virus after a 5-day treatment, the virus was still present and infectious in some of the participants. Furthermore those taking the medicine had fewer antibodies compared to those who did not which is a potential issue for boosting immunity.

After a 6-month follow-up, the PANORAMIC study showed that people who took the antiviral molnupiravir felt better, had fewer and less severe COVID-19 symptoms, took less time off and needed healthcare services less compared to those who received standard care. However, differences between the two groups were small and were evident only if a large number of people received molnupiravir.

=== Nirmatrelvir/ritonavir ===
As of March 2025, the results of PANORAMIC regarding nirmatrelvir/ritonavir are still being analysed.

== Significance ==
According to a paper reviewing how the PANORAMIC trial was delivered, learnings from the trial could be useful in preparing for future pandemics and for health research in general. The main recommendation of the review was that research conducted in primary care settings (as opposed to hospitals) should play a central role in future pandemics to help prevent the worsening of symptoms and hospitalisation. Further recommendations included the use of the platform study format, focusing on recruiting participants in care homes, and working on ways to rapidly deliver medicine to participants. The review also stressed the importance of building trust with diverse communities so that participation and involvement in research can be inclusive.

== Leadership and funding ==
The trial is led by Chris Butler and Richard Hobbs (University of Oxford) and Paul Little (University of Southampton). PANORAMIC is sponsored by the University of Oxford and funded and delivered by the National Institute for Health and Care Research (NIHR).

== Awards ==
The PANORAMIC trial received the Prix Galien Best Public Sector Innovation Award in 2024.

== See also ==
- COVID-19 drug repurposing research
- COVID-19 drug development
- AGILE trial
- RECOVERY Trial
- Solidarity trial
