= Anthony Gordon =

Anthony Gordon may refer to:

- Tony Gordon (active 2007–2010), fictional character in British soap opera Coronation Street
- Anthony Gordon (police officer) (c. 1976–2005), Canadian policeman, victim in the Mayerthorpe tragedy
- Tony Gordon (rugby) (c. 1948–2012), New Zealand rugby footballer and coach
- Anthony Gordon (footballer) (born 2001), English footballer
- Anthony Gordon (American football) (born 1997), American football quarterback
- Anthony Gordon (scientist), British clinical scientist
