= COVID-19 drug development =

Preventative and therapeutic medications for COVID-19 infection

COVID-19 drug development is the research process to develop preventative therapeutic prescription drugs that would alleviate the severity of coronavirus disease 2019 (COVID-19). From early 2020 through 2021, several hundred drug companies, biotechnology firms, university research groups, and health organizations were developing therapeutic candidates for COVID-19 disease in various stages of preclinical or clinical research (506 total candidates in April 2021), with 419 potential COVID-19 drugs in clinical trials, as of April 2021.

As early as March 2020, the World Health Organization (WHO), European Medicines Agency (EMA), US Food and Drug Administration (FDA), and the Chinese government and drug manufacturers were coordinating with academic and industry researchers to speed development of vaccines, antiviral drugs, and post-infection therapies. The International Clinical Trials Registry Platform of the WHO recorded 536 clinical studies to develop post-infection therapies for COVID-19 infections, with numerous established antiviral compounds for treating other infections under clinical research to be repurposed.

In March 2020, the WHO initiated the "SOLIDARITY Trial" in 10 countries, enrolling thousands of people infected with COVID-19 to assess treatment effects of four existing antiviral compounds with the most promise of efficacy. A dynamic, systematic review was established in April 2020 to track the progress of registered clinical trials for COVID-19 vaccine and therapeutic drug candidates.

Drug development is a multistep process, typically requiring more than five years to assure safety and efficacy of the new compound. Several national regulatory agencies, such as the EMA and the FDA, approved procedures to expedite clinical testing. By June 2021, dozens of potential post-infection therapies were in the final stage of human testing – Phase III–IV clinical trials.

== Background ==

Drug development is the process of bringing a new infectious disease vaccine or therapeutic drug to the market once a lead compound has been identified through the process of drug discovery. It includes laboratory research on microorganisms and animals, filing for regulatory status, such as via the FDA, for an investigational new drug to initiate clinical trials on humans, and may include the step of obtaining regulatory approval with a new drug application to market the drug. The entire process – from concept through preclinical testing in the laboratory to clinical trial development, including Phase I–III trials – to approved vaccine or drug normally takes more than a decade.

The term "preclinical research" is defined by laboratory studies in vitro and in vivo, indicating a beginning stage for development of a preventative vaccine, antiviral or other post-infection therapies, such as experiments to determine effective doses and toxicity in animals, before a candidate compound is advanced for safety and efficacy evaluation in humans. To complete the preclinical stage of drug development – then be tested for safety and efficacy in an adequate number of people infected with COVID-19 (hundreds to thousands in different countries) – is a process likely to require 1–2 years for COVID-19 therapies, according to several reports in early 2020. Despite these efforts, the success rate for drug candidates to reach eventual regulatory approval through the entire drug development process for treating infectious diseases is only 19%.

Phase I trials test primarily for safety and preliminary dosing in a few dozen healthy subjects, while Phase II trials – following success in Phase I – evaluate therapeutic efficacy against the COVID-19 disease at ascending dose levels (efficacy based on biomarkers), while closely evaluating possible adverse effects of the candidate therapy (or combined therapies), typically in hundreds of people. A common trial design for Phase II studies of possible COVID-19 drugs is randomized, placebo-controlled, blinded, and conducted at multiple sites, while determining more precise, effective doses and monitoring for adverse effects.

The success rate for Phase II trials to advance to Phase III (for all diseases) is about 31%, and for infectious diseases specifically, about 43%. Depending on its duration (longer more expensive) – typically a period of several months to two years – an average-length Phase II trial costs US$57 million (2013 dollars, including preclinical and Phase I costs). Successful completion of a Phase II trial does not reliably forecast that a candidate drug will be successful in Phase III research.

Phase III trials for COVID-19 involve hundreds-to-thousands of hospitalized participants, and test effectiveness of the treatment to reduce effects of the disease, while monitoring for adverse effects at the optimal dose, such as in the multinational Solidarity and Discovery trials.

== Candidates ==
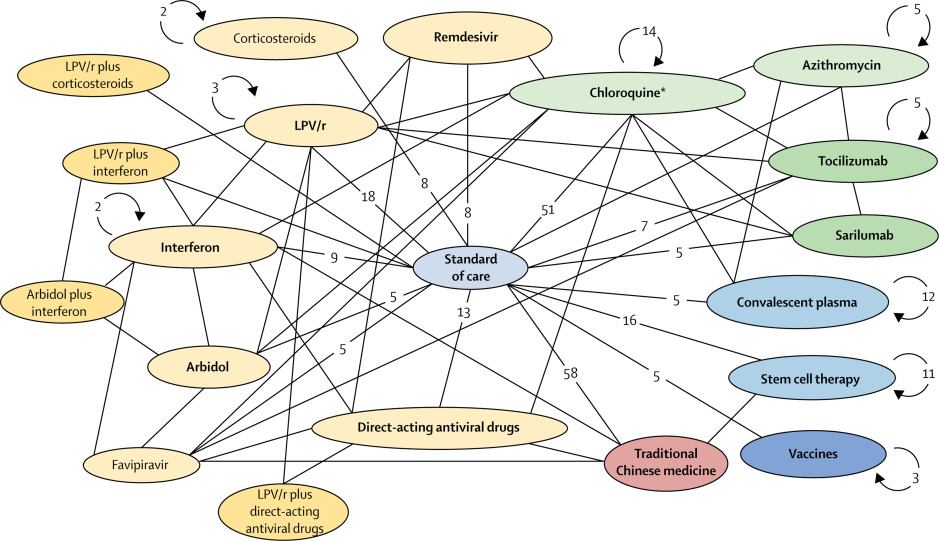
Evidence network of COVID-19 clinical trials of 15 therapeutic candidates. Circles represent interventions or intervention groups (categories). Lines between two circles indicate comparisons in clinical trials.

According to one source (as of August 2020), diverse categories of preclinical or early-stage clinical research for developing COVID-19 therapeutic candidates included:

- antibodies (81 candidates)
- antivirals (31 candidates)
- cell-based compounds (34 candidates)
- RNA-based compounds (6 candidates)
- scanning compounds to be repurposed (18 candidates)
- various other therapy categories, such as anti-inflammatory, antimalarial, interferon, protein-based, antibiotics, and receptor-modulating compounds.

Pivotal Phase III trials assess whether a candidate drug has efficacy specifically against a disease, and – in the case of people hospitalized with severe COVID-19 infections – test for an effective dose level of the repurposed or new drug candidate to improve the illness (primarily pneumonia) from COVID-19 infection. For an already-approved drug (such as hydroxychloroquine for malaria), Phase III–IV trials determine in hundreds to thousands of COVID-19-infected people the possible extended use of an already-approved drug for treating COVID-19 infection. As of August 2020, over 500 candidate therapeutics were in preclinical or a stage of Phase I–IV development, with new Phase II–III trials announced for hundreds of therapeutic candidates during 2020.

Numerous candidate drugs under study as "supportive" treatments to relieve discomfort during illness, such as NSAIDs or bronchodilators, are not included in the table below. Others in early-stage Phase II trials or numerous treatment candidates in Phase I trials, are also excluded. Drug candidates in Phase I–II trials have a low rate of success (under 12%) to pass through all trial phases to gain eventual approval. Once having reached Phase III trials, therapeutic candidates for diseases related to COVID-19 infection – infectious and respiratory diseases – have a success rate of about 72%.

COVID-19: candidate drug treatments in Phase III–IV trials
Drug candidate	Description	Existing disease approval	Trial sponsor(s)	Location(s)	Expected results	Notes, references
Remdesivir	antiviral; adenosine nucleotide analog inhibiting RNA synthesis in coronaviruses	investigational	Gilead, WHO, INSERM, NIAID	China, Japan initially; extended internationally in Global Solidarity and Discovery Trials, and US NIAID ACTT Trial	Mid-2020 (Chinese, Japanese trials)	selectively provided by Gilead for COVID-19 emergency access; both promising and negative effects reported in April 2020.
Hydroxychloroquine or chloroquine	antiparasitic and antirheumatic; generic made by many manufacturers	malaria, rheumatoid arthritis, lupus (International)	CEPI, WHO, INSERM	Multiple sites in China; global Solidarity and Discovery Trials	June 2020 (discontinued by WHO)	multiple side effects; possible adverse prescription drug interactions; discontinued in June from WHO Solidarity trial and UK Recovery trial as "having no clinical benefit in hospitalised patients with COVID-19"; trials
Favipiravir	antiviral against influenza	influenza (China)	Fujifilm	China	April 2020	
Lopinavir/ritonavir without or with interferon beta-1a	antiviral, immune suppression	investigational combination; lopinavir/ritonavir approved for HIV	CEPI, WHO, UK Government, Univ. of Oxford, INSERM	Global Solidarity and Discovery Trials, multiple countries	mid-2020	
Sarilumab	human monoclonal antibody against interleukin-6 receptor	rheumatoid arthritis (US, Europe)	Regeneron-Sanofi	Multiple countries	Spring 2020	
ASC-09 + ritonavir	antiviral	combination not approved; ritonavir approved for HIV	Ascletis Pharma	Multiple sites in China	Spring 2020	
Tocilizumab	human monoclonal antibody against interleukin-6 receptor	immunosuppression, rheumatoid arthritis (US, Europe)	Genentech-Hoffmann-La Roche	Multiple countries	mid-2020	Roche announced in late July that its Phase III trial of tocilizumab for treating pneumonia in hospitalized people with COVID-19 infection was ineffective
Lenzilumab	humanized monoclonal antibody for relieving pneumonia	new drug candidate	Humanigen, Inc.	Multiple sites in the United States	September 2020	
Dapagliflozin	sodium-glucose cotransporter 2 inhibitor	hypoglycemia agent	Saint Luke's Mid America Heart Institute, AstraZeneca	Multiple countries	December 2020	
CD24Fc	antiviral immunomodulator against inflammatory response	new drug candidate	OncoImmune, Inc.	Multiple sites in the United States	2021	
Apabetalone	selective BET inhibitor	investigational	Resverlogix Corp	United States	22 March 2022	

== Repurposed drug candidates ==
Drug repositioning (also called drug repurposing) – the investigation of existing drugs for new therapeutic purposes – is one line of scientific research followed to develop safe and effective COVID-19 treatments. Several existing antiviral medications, previously developed or used as treatments for Severe acute respiratory syndrome (SARS), Middle East respiratory syndrome (MERS), HIV/AIDS, and malaria, are being researched as COVID-19 treatments, with some moving into clinical trials.

During the COVID-19 pandemic, drug repurposing is the clinical research process of rapidly screening and defining the safety and efficacy of existing drugs already approved for other diseases to be used for people with COVID-19 infection. In the usual drug development process, confirmation of repurposing for new disease treatment would take many years of clinical research – including pivotal Phase III clinical trials – on the candidate drug to assure its safety and efficacy specifically for treating COVID-19 infection. In the emergency of a growing COVID-19 pandemic, the drug repurposing process was being accelerated during March 2020 to treat people hospitalized with COVID-19.

Clinical trials using repurposed, generally safe, existing drugs for hospitalized COVID-19 people may take less time and have lower overall costs to obtain endpoints proving safety (absence of serious side effects) and post-infection efficacy, and can rapidly access existing drug supply chains for manufacturing and worldwide distribution. In an international effort to capture these advantages, the WHO began in mid-March 2020 expedited international Phase II–III trials on four promising treatment options – the SOLIDARITY trial – with numerous other drugs having potential for repurposing in different disease treatment strategies, such as anti-inflammatory, corticosteroid, antibody, immune, and growth factor therapies, among others, being advanced into Phase II or III trials during 2020.

In March 2020, the United States Centers for Disease Control and Prevention (CDC) issued a physician advisory concerning remdesivir for people hospitalized with pneumonia caused by COVID-19: "While clinical trials are critical to establish the safety and efficacy of this drug, clinicians without access to a clinical trial may request remdesivir for compassionate use through the manufacturer for patients with clinical pneumonia."

== Novel antibody drugs ==
=== Convalescent plasma ===
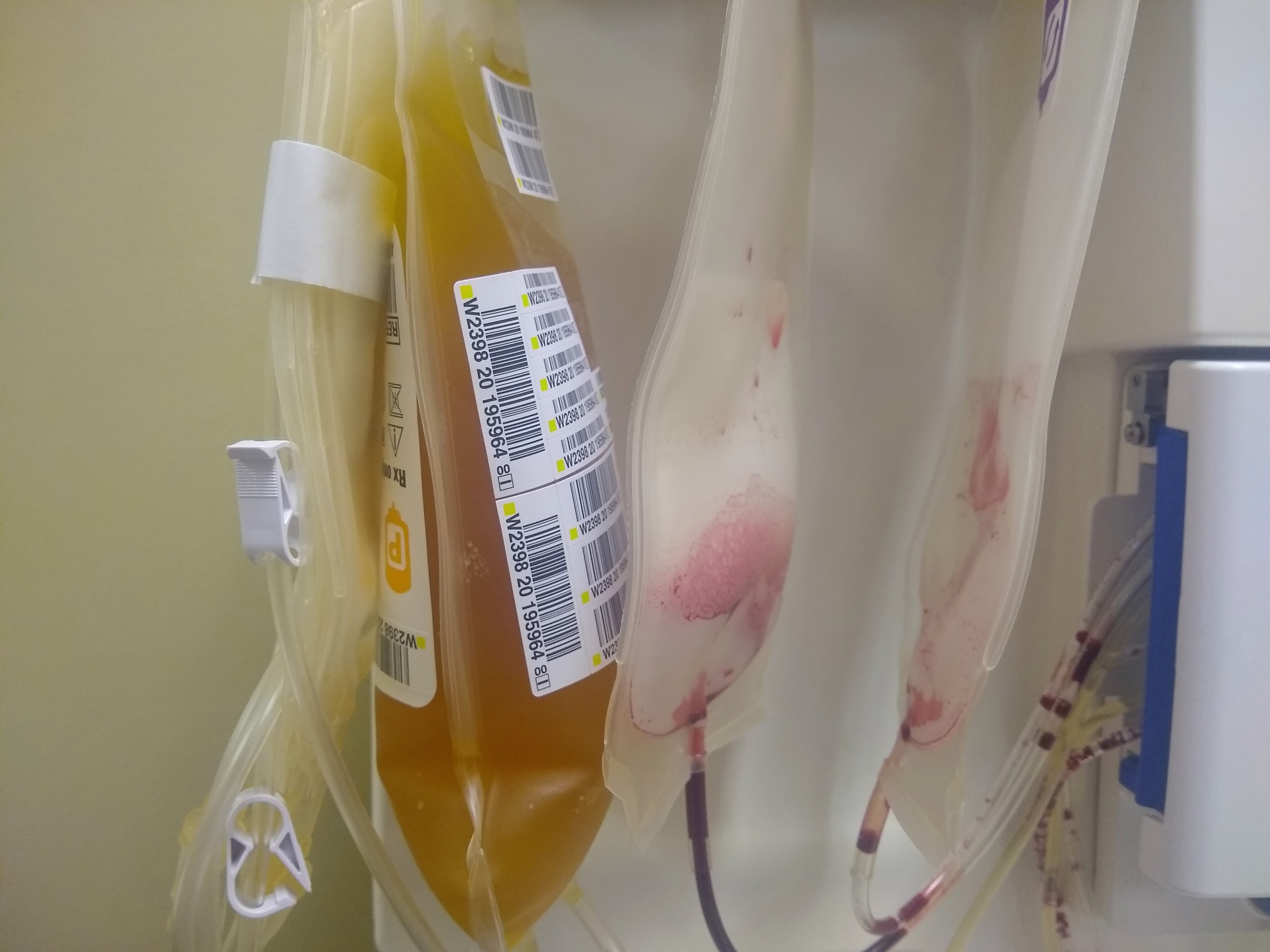
Convalescent plasma collected at a blood donor center during the COVID-19 pandemic.

Passive immunization with convalescent plasma or hyperimmune serum has been proposed as a potential treatment for COVID-19. As of May 2021, there is strong evidence that convalescent plasma treatment is not associated with clinical improvements for people with moderate or severe disease and does not decrease the risk of dying. The potential for adverse effects associated with convalescent plasma treatment is unknown.

In the United States, the Food and Drug Administration (FDA) granted temporary authorization to convalescent plasma (plasma from the blood of people who have recovered from COVID-19, which thus contains antibodies against SARS-CoV-2) as an experimental treatment in cases where the person's life is seriously or immediately threatened. As of May 2021, at least 12 randomized controlled trials on the effectiveness of convalescent plasma treatment were published in peer-reviewed medical journals. In addition, as of May 2021, 100 additional trials were 'ongoing' and 33 studies were reported as 'competed' but not yet published.

Argentina, Brazil, Costa Rica, and Mexico have pursued development of antisera. Brazil began development of an equine hyperimmune serum, obtained by inoculating horses with recombinant SARS-CoV-2 spike protein, in mid-2020. A consortium of Instituto Vital Brazil, UFRJ, the Oswaldo Cruz Foundation and the D'Or Institute for Research and Education in Rio de Janeiro began preclinical trials in May 2020, while Instituto Butantan in São Paulo completed animal testing in September. In December 2020, Argentina granted emergency authorization to CoviFab, a locally developed formulation of equine hyperimmune serum, for use in cases of moderate to severe COVID-19, based on the initial results of a single phase 2/3 trial which suggested reductions in mortality, ICU admission, and mechanical ventilation requirements in patients who received the serum. This was harshly criticized by the Argentine Intensive Care Society, which stated that the trial failed to achieve its primary or secondary endpoints and did not demonstrate any statistically significant differences between the serum and placebo groups.

=== Bamlanivimab/etesevimab ===
Bamlanivimab/etesevimab is a combination of two monoclonal antibodies, bamlanivimab and etesevimab, administered together via intravenous infusion as a treatment for COVID-19. Both types of antibody target the surface spike protein of SARS‑CoV‑2.

Bamlanivimab and etesevimab, administered together, are authorized in the United States for the treatment of mild-to-moderate COVID-19 in people aged twelve years of age and older weighing at least 40 kilograms (88 lb) with positive results of direct SARS-CoV-2 viral testing, and who are at high risk for progression to severe COVID-19, including hospitalization or death. They are also authorized, when administered together, for use after exposure to the SARS-CoV-2 virus for post-exposure prophylaxis (PEP) for COVID-19 and are not authorized for pre-exposure prophylaxis to prevent COVID-19 before being exposed to the SARS-CoV-2 virus.

In January 2022, the U.S. Food and Drug Administration (FDA) revised the authorizations for two monoclonal antibody treatments – bamlanivimab/etesevimab (administered together) and casirivimab/imdevimab – to limit their use to only when the recipients are likely to have been infected with or exposed to a variant that is susceptible to these treatments. Because data show these treatments are highly unlikely to be active against the omicron variant, which is circulating at a very high frequency throughout the United States, these treatments are not authorized for use in any U.S. states, territories, and jurisdictions at this time.

=== Bebtelovimab ===
Bebtelovimab is a monoclonal antibody developed by AbCellera and Eli Lilly as a treatment for COVID-19.

Possible side effects include itching, rash, infusion-related reactions, nausea and vomiting.

Bebtelovimab works by binding to the spike protein of the virus that causes COVID-19, similar to other monoclonal antibodies that have been authorized for the treatment of high-risk people with mild to moderate COVID-19 and shown a benefit in reducing the risk of hospitalization or death. Bebtelovimab is a neutralizing human immunoglobulin G1 (IgG1) monoclonal antibody, isolated from a patient who has recovered from the Coronavirus disease 2019 (COVID-19), directed against the spike (S) protein of severe acute respiratory syndrome coronavirus-2 (SARS-CoV-2), that can potentially be used for immunization against COVID-19.

As of November 2022, bebtelovimab is not authorized for emergency use in the US because it is not expected to neutralize Omicron subvariants BQ.1 and BQ.1.1.

=== Casirivimab/imdevimab ===
Casirivimab/imdevimab, sold under the brand names REGEN‑COV and Ronapreve in various countries, is a combination medicine used for the treatment and prevention of COVID‑19. It consists of two human monoclonal antibodies, casirivimab and imdevimab that must be mixed together and administered as an infusion or subcutaneous injection. The combination of two antibodies is intended to prevent mutational escape. It is also available as a co-formulated product. It was developed by the American biotechnology company Regeneron Pharmaceuticals.

The most common side effects include allergic reactions, which include infusion related reactions, injection site reactions, brief pain, weakness and others.

On 13 December 2024, the U.S. Food and Drug Administration revised its authorizations for the use of REGEN-COV. Its authorized uses are for post-exposure prophylaxis (prevention) and for the treatment of COVID-19, with restrictions for age, weight, and other factors of clinical importance.

On 5 December 2025, the European Union withdrew its marketing authorisation for Ronapreve, because Roche had formally notified it of its decision to permanently discontinue the marketing of the product.

=== Pemivibart ===
Pemivibart, sold under the brand name Pemgarda, is a monoclonal antibody medication authorized for the pre-exposure prophylaxis (prevention) of COVID‑19.

Pemivibart was developed by Invivyd.

The US Food and Drug Administration (FDA) issued an emergency use authorization for pemivibart in March 2024.

=== Regdanvimab ===
Regdanvimab, sold under the brand name Regkirona, is a human monoclonal antibody used for the treatment of COVID-19. The antibody is directed against the spike protein of SARS-CoV-2. It is developed by Celltrion. The medicine is given by infusion (drip) into a vein.

The most common side effects include infusion-related reactions, including allergic reactions and anaphylaxis.

Regdanvimab was authorized for medical use in the European Union in November 2021.

=== Sotrovimab ===
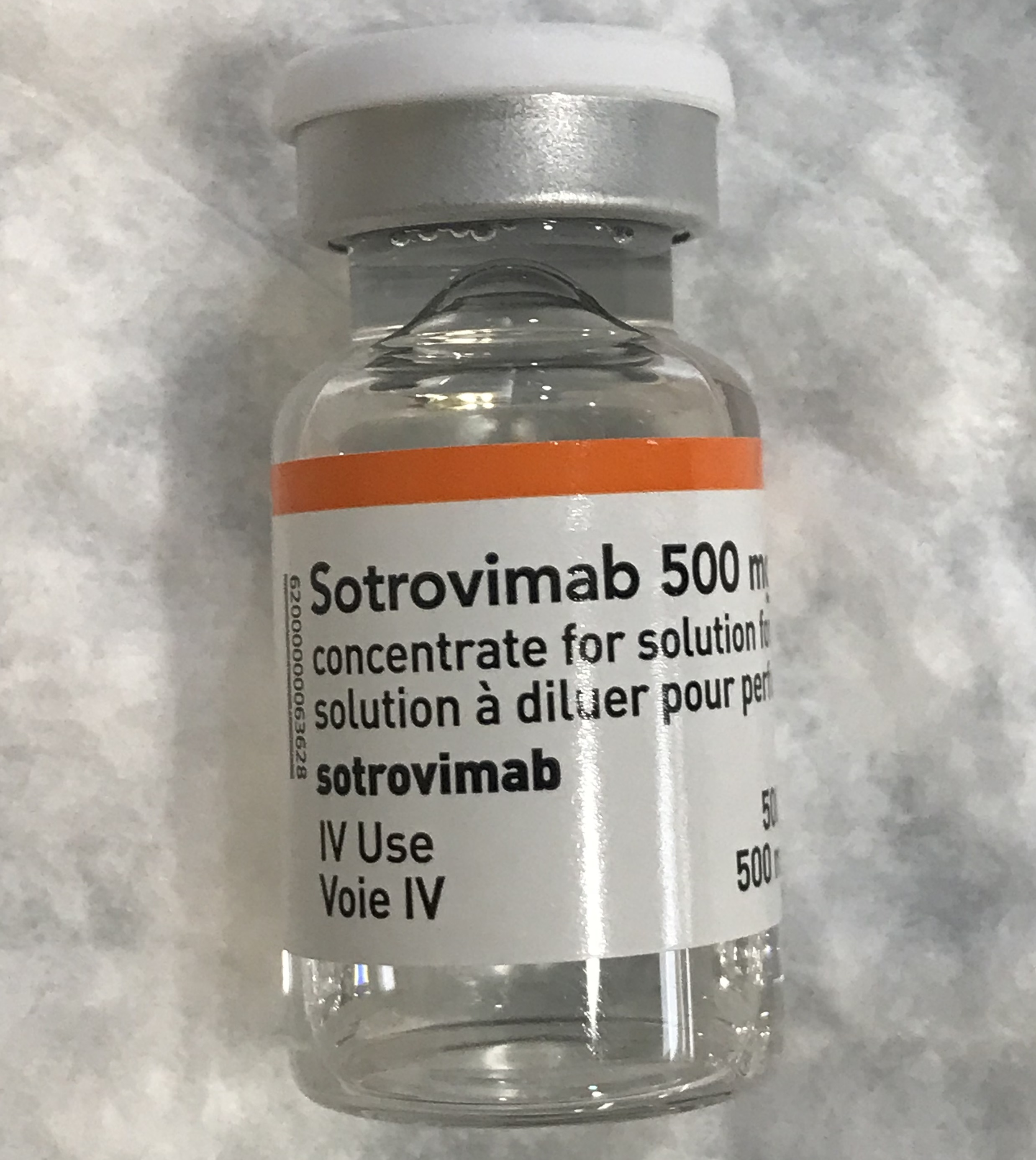
A vial of Sotrovimab

Sotrovimab, sold under the brand name Xevudy, is a human neutralizing monoclonal antibody with activity against severe acute respiratory syndrome coronavirus 2, known as SARS-CoV-2. It was developed by GlaxoSmithKline and Vir Biotechnology, Inc. Sotrovimab is designed to attach to the spike protein of SARS-CoV-2.

The most common side effects include hypersensitivity (allergic) reactions and infusion-related reactions.

Although Sotrovimab was used world-wide against SARS-CoV-2, including in the United States under an FDA emergency use authorization (EUA), the FDA canceled the EUA in April 2022 due to lack of efficacy against the Omicron variant.

=== Tixagevimab/cilgavimab ===
Tixagevimab/cilgavimab, sold under the brand name Evusheld, is a combination of two human monoclonal antibodies, tixagevimab (AZD8895) and cilgavimab (AZD1061) targeted against the surface spike protein of SARS-CoV-2 used to prevent COVID-19. It is being developed by British-Swedish multinational pharmaceutical and biotechnology company AstraZeneca. It is co-packaged and given as two separate consecutive intramuscular injections (one injection per monoclonal antibody, given in immediate succession).

=== Vilobelimab ===
Vilobelimab, sold under the brand name Gohibic, is a monoclonal antibody that is used for the treatment of COVID-19. It is a human-mouse chimeric IgG4 kappa antibody that targets human C5a in plasma.

The most common adverse reactions include pneumonia, sepsis, delirium, pulmonary embolism, hypertension, pneumothorax, deep vein thrombosis, herpes simplex, enterococcal infection, bronchopulmonary aspergillosis, hepatic enzyme increased, urinary tract infection, hypoxia, thrombocytopenia, pneumomediastinum, respiratory tract infection, supraventricular tachycardia, constipation, and rash.

Vilobelimab is a recombinant chimeric monoclonal IgG4 antibody that specifically binds to the soluble human complement split product C5a after cleavage from C5 to block its interaction with the C5a receptor, both of which are components of the complement system thought to contribute to inflammation and worsening of COVID-19. Vilobelimab was granted an emergency use authorization (EUA) by the US Food and Drug Administration (FDA) in April 2023. Vilobelimab was authorized for medical use in the European Union in January 2025.

== Novel viral replication inhibitors ==
=== Molnupiravir ===
Molnupiravir, sold under the brand name Lagevrio, is an antiviral medication that inhibits the replication of certain RNA viruses. It is used to treat COVID‑19 in those infected by SARS-CoV-2. It is taken by mouth.

Molnupiravir is a prodrug of the synthetic nucleoside derivative N^{4}-hydroxycytidine and exerts its antiviral action by introducing copying errors during viral RNA replication.

Molnupiravir was originally developed to treat influenza at Emory University by the university's drug innovation company, Drug Innovation Ventures at Emory (DRIVE), but was reportedly abandoned for mutagenicity concerns. It was then acquired by the Miami-based company Ridgeback Biotherapeutics, which later partnered with Merck & Co. to develop the drug further.

Based on positive results in placebo-controlled double-blind randomized clinical trials, molnupiravir was approved for medical use in the United Kingdom in November 2021. In December 2021, the US Food and Drug Administration (FDA) granted an emergency use authorization (EUA) to molnupiravir for use in certain populations where other treatments are not feasible. The emergency use authorization was only narrowly approved (13–10) because of questions about efficacy and concerns that molnupiravir's mutagenic effects could create new variants that evade immunity and prolong the COVID‑19 pandemic. In September 2023, molnupiravir's viral mutagenicity was confirmed to contribute to circulating SARS-CoV-2 genomic variation in a study of global SARS CoV 2 isolates after 2022: molnupiravir-specific genomic changes were more common, especially where molnupiravir had been used.

== Novel protease inhibitors ==
=== Ensitrelvir ===
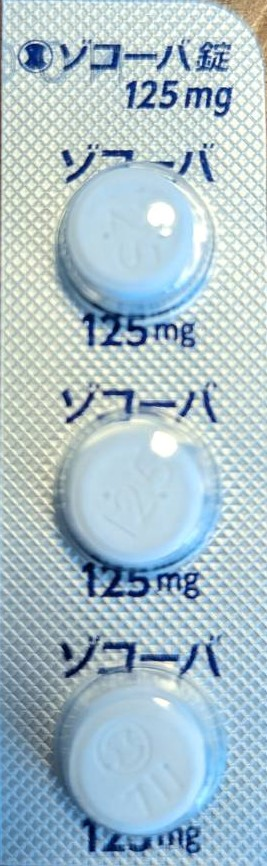
Xocova in a Japanese blister pack

Ensitrelvir, sold under the brand names Xocova and Zokovea, is an antiviral medication used as a treatment for COVID-19 and as post-exposure prophylaxis (PEP) to prevent COVID-19 infections following exposure. It was developed by Shionogi in partnership with Hokkaido University and acts as an orally active 3C-like protease inhibitor. It is taken by mouth.

The most common adverse events include transient decreases in high-density lipoprotein and increased blood triglycerides.

=== Nirmatrelvir/ritonavir ===
Nirmatrelvir/ritonavir, sold under the brand name Paxlovid, is a co-packaged medication used as a treatment for COVID-19. It contains the antiviral medications nirmatrelvir and ritonavir and was developed by Pfizer. Nirmatrelvir inhibits SARS-CoV-2 main protease, while ritonavir is a strong CYP3A inhibitor, slowing down nirmatrelvir metabolism and therefore boosting its effect. It is taken by mouth.

In unvaccinated high-risk people with COVID-19, nirmatrelvir/ritonavir can reduce the risk of hospitalization or death by 88% if taken within five days of symptom onset. People who take nirmatrelvir/ritonavir also test negative for COVID-19 about two and a half days earlier than people who do not. Side effects of nirmatrelvir/ritonavir include changes in sense of taste (dysgeusia), diarrhea, high blood pressure (hypertension), and muscle pain (myalgia).

In December 2021, the United States Food and Drug Administration (FDA) granted nirmatrelvir/ritonavir emergency use authorization (EUA) to treat COVID-19. It was approved in the United Kingdom later that month, and in the European Union and Canada in January 2022. In May 2023, it was approved in the US to treat mild-to-moderate COVID-19 in adults who are at high risk for progression to severe COVID-19, including hospitalization or death, relative to the general population. The FDA considers the combination to be a first-in-class medication. In 2023, it was the 159th most commonly prescribed medication in the United States, with more than 3 million prescriptions.

== Other ==
=== Sabizabulin ===
Sabizabulin is an investigational new drug that is being evaluated for the treatment of castration-resistant prostate cancer and in SARS-CoV-2 (COVID-19) infections. It is a tubulin polymerization inhibitor.

Sabizabulin is chemical compound from the group of indole and imidazole derivatives that was first reported in 2012 by Dalton, Li, and Miller. A new synthesis method has recently been published, using 3,4,5-trimethoxybenzoic acid and indole-3-carboxylic acid as starting materials.

== Planning and coordination ==
=== Early planning ===
Over 2018–20, new initiatives to stimulate vaccine and antiviral drug development included partnerships between governmental organizations and industry, such as the European Innovative Medicines Initiative, the US Critical Path Initiative to enhance innovation of drug development, and the Breakthrough Therapy designation to expedite development and regulatory review of promising candidate drugs. To accelerate refinement of diagnostics for detecting COVID-19 infection, a global diagnostic pipeline tracker was formed.

According to a tracker of clinical trial progress on potential therapeutic drugs for COVID-19 infections, 29 Phase II–IV efficacy trials were concluded in March 2020 or scheduled to provide results in April from hospitals in China – which experienced the first outbreak of COVID-19 in late 2019. Seven trials were evaluating repurposed drugs already approved to treat malaria, including four studies on hydroxychloroquine or chloroquine phosphate. Repurposed antiviral drugs make up most of the Chinese research, with 9 Phase III trials on remdesivir across several countries due to report by the end of April. Other potential therapeutic candidates under pivotal clinical trials concluding in March–April are vasodilators, corticosteroids, immune therapies, lipoic acid, bevacizumab, and recombinant angiotensin-converting enzyme 2, among others.

The COVID-19 Clinical Research Coalition has goals to 1) facilitate rapid reviews of clinical trial proposals by ethics committees and national regulatory agencies, 2) fast-track approvals for the candidate therapeutic compounds, 3) ensure standardised and rapid analysis of emerging efficacy and safety data, and 4) facilitate sharing of clinical trial outcomes before publication. A dynamic review of clinical development for COVID-19 vaccine and drug candidates was in place, as of April.

By March 2020, the international Coalition for Epidemic Preparedness Innovations (CEPI) committed to research investments of US$100 million across several countries, and issued an urgent call to raise and rapidly invest $2 billion for vaccine development. Led by the Bill and Melinda Gates Foundation with partners investing US$125 million and coordinating with the World Health Organization, the COVID-19 Therapeutics Accelerator began in March, facilitating drug development researchers to rapidly identify, assess, develop, and scale up potential treatments. The COVID-19 Clinical Research Coalition formed to coordinate and expedite results from international clinical trials on the most promising post-infection treatments. In early 2020, numerous established antiviral compounds for treating other infections were being repurposed or developed in new clinical research efforts to alleviate the illness of COVID-19.

During March 2020, the Coalition for Epidemic Preparedness Innovations (CEPI) initiated an international COVID-19 vaccine development fund, with the goal to raise US$2 billion for vaccine research and development, and committed to investments of US$100 million in vaccine development across several countries. The Canadian government announced CA$275 million in funding for 96 research projects on medical countermeasures against COVID-19, including numerous vaccine candidates at Canadian universities, with plans to establish a "vaccine bank" of new vaccines for implementation if another COVID-19 outbreak occurs. The Bill & Melinda Gates Foundation invested US$150 million in April for development of COVID-19 vaccines, diagnostics, and therapeutics.

==== Computer-assisted research ====
In March 2020, the United States Department of Energy, National Science Foundation, NASA, industry, and nine universities pooled resources to access supercomputers from IBM, combined with cloud computing resources from Hewlett Packard Enterprise, Amazon, Microsoft, and Google, for drug discovery. The COVID-19 High Performance Computing Consortium also aims to forecast disease spread, model possible vaccines, and screen thousands of chemical compounds to design a COVID-19 vaccine or therapy. The Consortium used up 437 petaFLOPS of computing power by May 2020.

The C3.ai Digital Transformation Institute, an additional consortium of Microsoft, six universities (including the Massachusetts Institute of Technology, a member of the first consortium), and the National Center for Supercomputer Applications in Illinois, working under the auspices of C3.ai, an artificial intelligence software company, are pooling supercomputer resources toward drug discovery, medical protocol development and public health strategy improvement, as well as awarding large grants to researchers who proposed by May to use AI to carry out similar tasks.

In March 2020, the distributed computing project Folding@home launched a program to assist drug developers, initially simulating protein targets from SARS-CoV-2 and the related SARS-CoV virus, which has been studied previously.

Distributed computing project Rosetta@home also joined the effort in March. The project uses computers of volunteers to model SARS-CoV-2 virus proteins to discover possible drug targets or create new proteins to neutralize the virus. Researchers revealed that with the help of Rosetta@home, they had been able to "accurately predict the atomic-scale structure of an important coronavirus protein weeks before it could be measured in the lab."

In May 2020, the OpenPandemics – COVID-19 partnership between Scripps Research and IBM's World Community Grid was launched. The partnership is a distributed computing project that "will automatically run a simulated experiment in the background [of connected home PCs] which will help predict the effectiveness of a particular chemical compound as a possible treatment for COVID-19".

=== International Solidarity and Discovery Trials ===
In March, the World Health Organization (WHO) launched the coordinated "Solidarity Trial" in 10 countries on five continents to rapidly assess in thousands of COVID-19 infected people the potential efficacy of existing antiviral and anti-inflammatory agents not yet evaluated specifically for COVID-19 illness. By late April, hospitals in over 100 countries were involved in the trial.

The individual or combined drugs undergoing initial studied are 1) lopinavir–ritonavir combined, 2) lopinavir–ritonavir combined with interferon-beta, 3) remdesivir or 4) (hydroxy)chloroquine in separate trials and hospital sites internationally. Following a study published by The Lancet on safety concerns with hydroxychloroquine, the WHO suspended use of it from the Solidarity trial in May 2020, reinstated it after the research was retracted, then abandoned further use of the drug for COVID-19 treatment when analysis showed in June that it provided no benefit.

With about 15% of people infected by COVID-19 having severe illness, and hospitals being overwhelmed during the pandemic, WHO recognized a rapid clinical need to test and repurpose these drugs as agents already approved for other diseases and recognized as safe. The Solidarity project is designed to give rapid insights to key clinical questions:

- Do any of the drugs reduce mortality?
- Do any of the drugs reduce the time a patient is hospitalized?
- Do the treatments affect the need for people with COVID-19-induced pneumonia to be ventilated or maintained in intensive care?
- Could such drugs be used to minimize the illness of COVID-19 infection in healthcare staff and people at high risk of developing severe illness?

Enrolling people with COVID-19 infection is simplified by using data entries, including informed consent, on a WHO website. After the trial staff determines the drugs available at the hospital, the WHO website randomizes the hospitalized subject to one of the trial drugs or to the hospital standard of care for treating COVID-19. The trial physician records and submits follow-up information about the subject status and treatment, completing data input via the WHO Solidarity website. The design of the Solidarity trial is not double-blind – which is normally the standard in a high-quality clinical trial – but the WHO needed speed with quality for the trial across many hospitals and countries. A global safety monitoring board of WHO physicians examine interim results to assist decisions on safety and effectiveness of the trial drugs, and alter the trial design or recommend an effective therapy. A similar web-based study to Solidarity, called "Discovery", was initiated in March across seven countries by INSERM (Paris, France).

The Solidarity trial seeks to implement coordination across hundreds of hospital sites in different countries – including those with poorly-developed infrastructure for clinical trials – yet needs to be conducted rapidly. According to John-Arne Røttingen, chief executive of the Research Council of Norway and chairman of the Solidarity trial international steering committee, the trial would be considered effective if therapies are determined to "reduce the proportion of patients that need ventilators by, say, 20%, that could have a huge impact on our national health-care systems."

During March, funding for the Solidarity trial reached US$108 million from 203,000 individuals, organizations and governments, with 45 countries involved in financing or trial management.

A clinical trial design in progress may be modified as an "adaptive design" if accumulating data in the trial provide early insights about positive or negative efficacy of the treatment. The global Solidarity and European Discovery trials of hospitalized people with severe COVID-19 infection apply adaptive design to rapidly alter trial parameters as results from the four experimental therapeutic strategies emerge. Adaptive designs within ongoing Phase II–III clinical trials on candidate therapeutics may shorten trial durations and use fewer subjects, possibly expediting decisions for early termination or success, and coordinating design changes for a specific trial across its international locations.

=== Adaptive COVID-19 Treatment Trial ===
The US National Institute of Allergy and Infectious Diseases (NIAID) initiated an adaptive design, international Phase III trial (called "ACTT") to involve up to 800 hospitalized COVID-19 people at 100 sites in multiple countries. Beginning with use of remdesivir as the primary treatment over 29 days, the trial definition of its adaptive protocol states that "there will be interim monitoring to introduce new arms and allow early stopping for futility, efficacy, or safety. If one therapy proves to be efficacious, then this treatment may become the control arm for comparison(s) with new experimental treatment(s)."

=== Operation Warp Speed ===
Operation Warp Speed (OWS) was a public–private partnership initiated by the United States government to facilitate and accelerate the development, manufacturing, and distribution of COVID-19 vaccines, therapeutics, and diagnostics. The first news report of Operation Warp Speed was on April 29, 2020, and the program was officially announced on May 15, 2020. It was headed by Moncef Slaoui from May 2020 to January 2021 and by David A. Kessler from January to February 2021. At the end of February 2021, Operation Warp Speed was transferred into the responsibilities of the White House COVID-19 Response Team.

The program promoted mass production of multiple vaccines, and different types of vaccine technologies, based on preliminary evidence. Then there were clinical trials. The plan anticipated that some of these vaccines would not prove safe or effective, making the program more costly than typical vaccine development, but potentially leading to the availability of a viable vaccine several months earlier than typical timelines.

Operation Warp Speed, initially funded with about $10 billion from the CARES Act (Coronavirus Aid, Relief, and Economic Security) passed by the United States Congress on March 27, 2020, was an interagency program that includes components of the Department of Health and Human Services, including the Centers for Disease Control and Prevention, Food and Drug Administration, the National Institutes of Health (NIH), and the Biomedical Advanced Research and Development Authority (BARDA); the Department of Defense; private firms; and other federal agencies, including the Department of Agriculture, the Department of Energy, and the Department of Veterans Affairs.

=== RECOVERY Trial ===
A large-scale, randomized controlled trial named the RECOVERY Trial was set up in March 2020, in the UK to test possible treatments for COVID-19. It is run by the Nuffield Departments of Public Health and of Medicine at the University of Oxford and is testing five repurposed drugs and also convalescent plasma. The trial enrolled more than 11,500 COVID-19 positive participants in the U.K by June 2020.

During April, the British RECOVERY (Randomised Evaluation of COVid-19 thERapY) trial was launched initially in 132 hospitals across the UK, expanding to become one of the world's largest COVID-19 clinical studies, involving 5400 infected people under treatment at 165 UK hospitals, as of mid-April. The trial is examining different potential therapies for severe COVID-19 infection: lopinavir/ritonavir, low-dose dexamethasone (an anti-inflammatory steroid), hydroxychloroquine, and azithromycin (a common antibiotic). In June, the trial arm using hydroxychloroquine was discontinued when analyses showed it provided no benefit.

On 16 June the trial group released a statement that dexamethasone had been shown to reduce mortality in patients receiving respiratory support. In a controlled trial around 2,000 hospital patients were given dexamethasone and were compared with more than 4,000 who did not receive the drug. For patients on ventilators, it cut the risk of death from 40% to 28% (1 in 8). For patients needing oxygen, it cut the risk of death from 25% to 20% (1 in 5).

By the end of June 2020, the trial had published findings regarding hydroxychloroquine and dexamethasone. It had also announced results for lopinavir/ritonavir which were published in October 2020. The lopinavir-ritonavir and hydroxychloroquine arms were closed to new entrants after being shown to be ineffective. Dexamethasone was closed to new adult entries after positive results and by November 2020, was open to child entries.

=== PANORAMIC trial ===
Launched in December 2021, the PANORAMIC trial will test the effectiveness of molnupiravir and nirmatrelvir/ritonavir in preventing hospitalisation and helping faster recovery for people aged over 50 and those at higher risk due to underlying health conditions. PANORAMIC is sponsored by the University of Oxford and funded by the National Institute for Health Research (NIHR). As of March 2022 has over 16,000 people enrolled as participants making it the largest study into COVID-19 antivirals.

== See also ==
- Cost of drug development
- COVID Moonshot
