= Clinical study design =

Plan for research in clinical medicine

Clinical study design is the formulation of clinical trials and other experiments, as well as observational studies, in medical research involving human beings and involving clinical aspects, including epidemiology. It is the design of experiments as applied to these fields. The goal of a clinical study is to assess the safety, efficacy, and / or the mechanism of action of an investigational medicinal product (IMP) or procedure, or new drug or device that is in development, but potentially not yet approved by a health authority (e.g. Food and Drug Administration). It can also be to investigate a drug, device or procedure that has already been approved but is still in need of further investigation, typically with respect to long-term effects or cost-effectiveness.

Some of the considerations here are shared under the more general topic of design of experiments but there can be others, in particular related to patient confidentiality and medical ethics.

== Outline of types of designs for clinical studies ==
=== Treatment studies ===
- Randomized controlled trial
  - Blind trial
  - Non-blind trial
- Adaptive clinical trial
  - Platform Trials
- Nonrandomized trial (quasi-experiment)
  - Interrupted time series design (measures on a sample or a series of samples from the same population are obtained several times before and after a manipulated event or a naturally occurring event) - considered a type of quasi-experiment
  - Single-arm study design

=== Observational studies ===
1. Descriptive

- Case report
- Case series
- Population study

2. Analytical

- Cohort study
  - Prospective cohort
  - Retrospective cohort
  - Time series study
- Case-control study
  - Nested case-control study
- Cross-sectional study
  - Community survey (a type of cross-sectional study)
- Ecological study

== Important considerations ==
When choosing a study design, many factors must be taken into account. Different types of studies are subject to different types of bias. For example, recall bias is likely to occur in cross-sectional or case-control studies where subjects are asked to recall exposure to risk factors. Subjects with the relevant condition (e.g. breast cancer) may be more likely to recall the relevant exposures that they had undergone (e.g. hormone replacement therapy) than subjects who don't have the condition.

The ecological fallacy may occur when conclusions about individuals are drawn from analyses conducted on grouped data. The nature of this type of analysis tends to overestimate the degree of association between variables.

=== Seasonal studies ===
Conducting studies in seasonal indications (such as allergies, Seasonal Affective Disorder, influenza, and others) can complicate a trial as patients must be enrolled quickly. Additionally, seasonal variations and weather patterns can affect a seasonal study.

== Other terms ==
- The term retrospective study is sometimes used as another term for a case-control study. This use of the term "retrospective study" is misleading, however, and should be avoided because other research designs besides case-control studies are also retrospective in orientation.
- Superiority trials are designed to demonstrate that one treatment is more effective than a given reference treatment. This type of study design is often used to test the effectiveness of a treatment compared to placebo or to the currently best available treatment.
- Non-inferiority trials are designed to demonstrate that a treatment is at least not appreciably less effective than a given reference treatment. This type of study design is often employed when comparing a new treatment to an established medical standard of care, in situations where the new treatment is cheaper, safer or more convenient than the reference treatment and would therefore be preferable if not appreciably less effective.
- Equivalence trials are designed to demonstrate that two treatments are equally effective.
- When using "parallel groups", each patient receives one treatment; in a "crossover study", each patient receives several treatments but in different order.
- A longitudinal study assesses research subjects over two or more points in time; by contrast, a cross-sectional study assesses research subjects at only one point in time (so case-control, cohort, and randomized studies are not cross-sectional).

== See also ==
- Conceptual framework
- Epidemiological methods
- Epidemiology
- Experimental control
- Meta-analysis
- Operationalization
- Academic clinical trials
- Design of experiments
- Research design
