= Solidarity trial =

Clinical trial program to identify COVID-19 therapies

The Solidarity trial for treatments is a multinational Phase III-IV clinical trial organized by the World Health Organization (WHO) and partners to compare four untested treatments for hospitalized people with severe COVID-19 illness. The trial was announced 18 March 2020, and as of 6 August 2021, 12,000 patients in 30 countries had been recruited to participate in the trial.

In May, the WHO announced an international coalition for simultaneously developing several candidate vaccines to prevent COVID-19 disease, calling this effort the Solidarity trial for vaccines.

The treatments being investigated are remdesivir, lopinavir/ritonavir combined, lopinavir/ritonavir combined with interferon-beta, and hydroxychloroquine or chloroquine. Hydroxychloroquine or chloroquine investigation was discontinued in June 2020 due to concluding that it provided no benefit.

== Solidarity trial for treatment candidates ==
The trial intends to rapidly assess thousands of COVID-19 infected people for the potential efficacy of existing antiviral and anti-inflammatory agents not yet evaluated specifically for COVID-19 illness, a process called "repurposing" or "repositioning" an already-approved drug for a different disease.

The Solidarity project is designed to give rapid insights to key clinical questions:

- Do any of the drugs reduce mortality?
- Do any of the drugs reduce the time a patient is hospitalized?
- Do the treatments affect the need for people with COVID-19-induced pneumonia to be ventilated or maintained in intensive care?
- Could such drugs be used to minimize the illness of COVID-19 infection in healthcare staff and people at high risk of developing severe illness?

Enrolling people with COVID-19 infection is simplified by gathering informed consent, and capturing data on an online clinical trial platform (Castor EDC). After the trial staff determine the drugs available at the hospital, the platform randomizes the hospitalized subject to one of the trial drugs or to the hospital standard of care for treating COVID-19. The trial physician records and submits follow-up information about the subject status and treatment, completing data input via the Castor EDC Platform. The design of the Solidarity trial is not double-blind – which is normally the standard in a high-quality clinical trial – but WHO needed speed with quality for the trial across many hospitals and countries. A global safety monitoring board of WHO physicians examine interim results to assist decisions on safety and effectiveness of the trial drugs, and alter the trial design or recommend an effective therapy. A similar web-based study to Solidarity, called "Discovery", was initiated in March across seven countries by INSERM (Paris, France).

The Solidarity trial seeks to implement coordination across hundreds of hospital sites in different countries – including those with poorly-developed infrastructure for clinical trials – yet needs to be conducted rapidly. According to John-Arne Røttingen, chief executive of the Research Council of Norway and chairman of the Solidarity trial international steering committee, the trial would be considered effective if therapies are determined to "reduce the proportion of patients that need ventilators by, say, 20%, that could have a huge impact on our national health-care systems."

=== Adaptive design ===
According to the WHO Director General, the aim of the trial is to "dramatically cut down the time needed to generate robust evidence about what drugs work", a process using an "adaptive design". The Solidarity and European Discovery trials apply adaptive design to rapidly alter trial parameters when results from the four experimental therapeutic strategies emerge.

Adaptive designs within ongoing Phase III-IV clinical trials – such as the Solidarity and Discovery projects – may shorten the trial duration and use fewer subjects, possibly expediting decisions for early termination to save costs if interim results are negative. If the Solidarity project shows early evidence of success, design changes across the project's international locations can be made rapidly to enhance overall outcomes of affected people and hasten use of the therapeutic drug.

== Treatment candidates under study ==
The individual or combined drugs being studied in the Solidarity and Discovery projects are already approved for other diseases. They are:

- Remdesivir
- Lopinavir/ritonavir combined
- Lopinavir/ritonavir combined with interferon-beta
- Hydroxychloroquine or chloroquine (discontinued due to no benefit, June 2020)

Due to safety concerns and evidence of heart arrhythmias leading to higher death rates, the WHO suspended the hydroxychloroquine arm of the Solidarity trial in late May 2020, then reinstated it, then withdrew it again when an interim analysis in June showed that hydroxychloroquine provided no benefit to hospitalized people severely infected with COVID-19.

In October 2020, the World Health Organization Solidarity trial produced an interim report concluding that its "remdesivir, hydroxychloroquine, lopinavir and interferon regimens appeared to have little or no effect on hospitalized COVID-19, as indicated by overall mortality, initiation of ventilation and duration of hospital stay." Gilead – the manufacturer of remdesivir – criticized the Solidarity trial methodology after it showed no benefit of the treatments, claiming that the international nature of the Solidarity trial was a weakness, whereas many experts regard the multinational study as a strength. Purchase agreements between the EU and Gilead for remdesivir and granting of its Emergency Use Authorization by the US FDA during October were questioned by Solidarity trial scientists as not based on positive clinical trial data, when the interim analysis of the Solidarity trial had found remdesivir to be ineffective.

In January 2022, the Canadian component of the Solidarity trial reported that in-hospital people with COVID-19 treated with remdesivir had lower death rates (by about 4%) and reduced need for oxygen (less by 5%) and mechanical ventilation (less by 7%) compared to people receiving standard-of-care treatments.

== Support and participation ==
During March, funding for the Solidarity trial reached US$108 million from 203,000 individual donations, charitable organizations and governments, with 45 countries involved in financing or trial management. As of 1 July 2020, nearly 5,500 patients in 21 countries of 39 that have approval to recruit were recruited to participate in the trial. More than 100 countries in all 6 WHO regions have expressed interest in participating.

== Solidarity trial for vaccine candidates ==
The WHO has developed a multinational coalition of vaccine scientists defining a Global Target Product Profile (TPP) for COVID-19, identifying favorable attributes of safe and effective vaccines under two broad categories: "vaccines for the long-term protection of people at higher risk of COVID-19, such as healthcare workers", and other vaccines to provide rapid-response immunity for new outbreaks. The international TPP team was formed to 1) assess the development of the most promising candidate vaccines; 2) map candidate vaccines and their clinical trial worldwide, publishing a frequently-updated "landscape" of vaccines in development; 3) rapidly evaluate and screen for the most promising candidate vaccines simultaneously before they are tested in humans; and 4) design and coordinate a multiple-site, international randomized controlled trial – the Solidarity trial for vaccines – to enable simultaneous evaluation of the benefits and risks of different vaccine candidates under clinical trials in countries where there are high rates of COVID-19 disease, ensuring fast interpretation and sharing of results around the world. The WHO vaccine coalition will prioritize which vaccines should go into Phase II and III clinical trials, and determine harmonized Phase III protocols for all vaccines achieving the pivotal trial stage.

== Solidarity Plus Trial ==
The WHO announced in August 2021 that it will roll out the next phase Solidarity trial under the name Solidarity PLUS trial in 52 countries. The trial will enroll hospitalized patients to test three new drugs for potential treatment of COVID-19. These drugs include artesunate, imatinib and infliximab. The selection of these therapies was done by an independent expert panel of WHO. These drugs are already used for other indications: artesunate is used for malaria, imatinib for cancers, and infliximab, an anti-TNF agent is used for Crohn's Disease and rheumatoid arthritis. The drugs will be donated for the purpose of trial by their manufacturers.

== See also ==
- COVID-19 drug repurposing research
- COVID-19 drug development#Phase III-IV trials
- RECOVERY Trial
- PANORAMIC trial
- AGILE trial
