= AGILE (clinical trial) =

AGILE is a platform trial for early-phase evaluation of new treatments for SARS-CoV-2 infection. The trial platform is a collaboration led by the University of Liverpool, working with the Southampton Clinical Trials Unit, the Liverpool School of Tropical Medicine, the MRC Biostatistics Unit at the University of Cambridge and the National Institute for Health and Care Research (NIHR) Clinical Research Facilities. The AGILE platform is funded by the Medical Research Council, and the Wellcome Trust, with additional funding for specific candidate evaluations from the pharmaceutical industry and Unitaid. The Chief Investigator of the trial is Saye Hock Khoo.

== Overview ==
AGILE is a trial platform testing multiple treatments for COVID-19. Like other platform trials, AGILE utilises a master protocol which facilitates testing of novel and experimental therapies for SARS-CoV-2 infection; each candidate under investigation forms a separate candidate specific trial which sits under the umbrella of the master protocol. This approach allows flexibility to test and evaluate different treatments at the same time.

AGILE was created out of the recognition that conventional drug development is not fit for purpose when responding to a pandemic, since it is too slow, lacking the ability to respond to an evolving pathogen, changes in host immunity and constantly changing epidemiology. While larger and later phase trial platforms such as PANORAMIC and RECOVERY were established in the UK to evaluate the efficacy of new treatments, AGILE evaluates new and experimental therapies at a much earlier stage, including first evaluation in humans, selecting the most plausible candidates (based on in-vitro data) in order to establish proof of efficacy, gaining sufficient confidence to be included into large efficacy trials. Selection of candidates into the AGILE platform has been through a combination of approaches: independent evaluation from an external group of experts, evaluation through the UK COVID-19 Therapeutics Advisory Panel, and expertise within the trial team. The focus of AGILE shifted in 2022 to studying antiviral compounds, and in particular antiviral combination therapy.

=== Treatments ===
Treatments under evaluation include molnupiravir, high-dose nitazoxanide, the monoclonal antibody Vir 7832, intravenous favipiravir, and the combination of molnupiravir plus nirmatrelvir/ritonavir.

=== Trial design ===
AGILE differs from other trial platforms in several ways. The platform evaluates candidates at an early phase of drug development (including first-into-human use), utilising a seamless design to take the initial evaluation (focusing on drug safety and optimising the dose for clinical use) through to a preliminary evaluation of efficacy in patients infected with SARS-CoV-2. AGILE has received approval from the UK regulator (the Medicines and Healthcare products Regulatory Agency) to undertake first-into-human evaluations in individuals with SARS-CoV-2 infection.

AGILE utilises a Bayesian adaptive trial design. Unlike conventional frequentist evaluations, Bayesian model-based dose-finding approaches evaluate the risk of toxicity across the entire range of doses being tested. By having a single continuous model (and unlike the conventional approach which effectively treats each dosing tier as a statistically separate study), information at one dosing level is carried across to another, factoring in any likely increase in risk of toxicity with higher dosing. Because of its greater efficiency, this approach accelerates decision making, because it can be used to predict the likely toxicity at the next dosing tier, and (subject to stipulated safety rules) may even allow intermediate dosing tiers to be skipped.

For Phase II efficacy evaluation a Bayesian inference for the likelihood of a hazard ratio of >1.0 when compared with the control arm (i.e. estimating how likely a particular intervention is to have a better outcome than controls) for the chosen efficacy endpoint. For example, when evaluating the antiviral molnupiravir, the probability of a hazard ratio of >1.0 for swabs to become negative (by RNA detection) for molnupiravir was 75.4%, which fell just short of their pre-defined threshold of 8-0% for advancing a candidate to the next stage (Phase III) trial. In December 2022, results from the PANORAMIC trial (the largest randomised trial of molnupiravir) did not show any reduction in hospitalisations or death, although faster recovery times and modest improvements in viral load were reported.
