= Hydroxychloroquine =

Antimalarial medication

- Skeletal formula of hydroxychloroquine

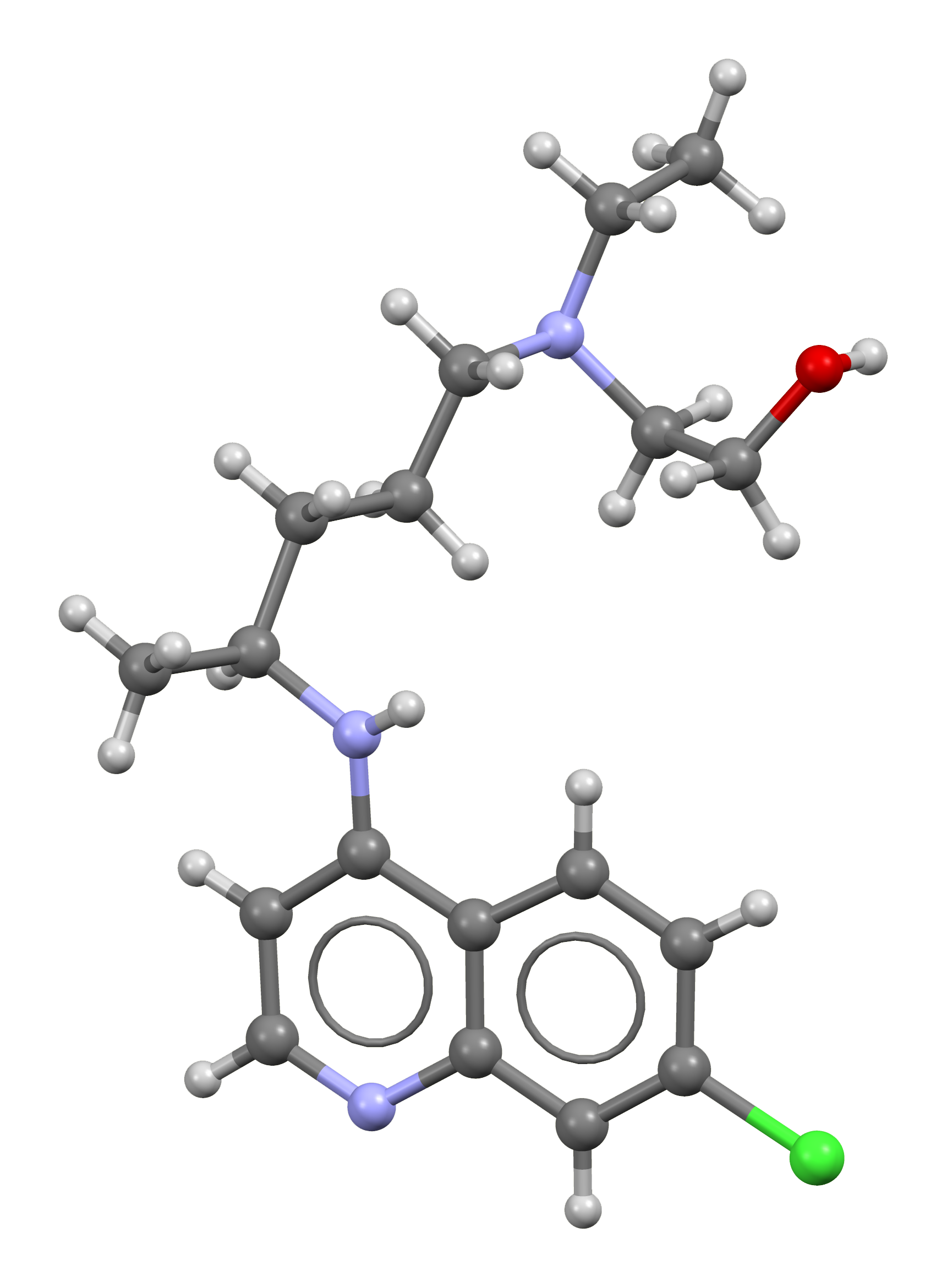
- Ball-and-stick model of the hydroxychloroquine freebase molecule

Clinical data
- Trade names: Plaquenil, others
- Other names: HCQ
- AHFS/Drugs.com: Monograph
- MedlinePlus: a601240
- License data: US DailyMed: Hydroxychloroquine
- Pregnancy category: AU: D
- Routes of administration: By mouth (tablets)
- ATC code: P01BA02 (WHO)

Legal status
- Legal status: AU: S4 (Prescription only); CA: ℞-only; UK: POM (Prescription only); US: ℞-only; In general: ℞ (Prescription only)

Pharmacokinetic data
- Bioavailability: Variable (74% on average)
- Protein binding: 45%
- Metabolism: Liver
- Elimination half-life: 32–50 days
- Excretion: Mostly kidney (23–25% as unchanged drug), also biliary (<10%)

Identifiers
- IUPAC name: (RS)-2-[{4-[(7-chloroquinolin-4-yl)amino]pentyl}(ethyl)amino]ethanol
- CAS Number: 118-42-3
- PubChem CID: 3652
- IUPHAR/BPS: 7198
- DrugBank: DB01611
- ChemSpider: 3526
- UNII: 4QWG6N8QKH
- KEGG: D08050; C07043
- ChEBI: CHEBI:5801
- ChEMBL: ChEMBL1535
- CompTox Dashboard (EPA): DTXSID8023135
- ECHA InfoCard: 100.003.864

Chemical and physical data
- Formula: C_{18}H_{26}ClN_{3}O
- Molar mass: 335.88 g·mol^{−1}
- 3D model (JSmol): Interactive image
- SMILES: Clc1cc2nccc(c2cc1)NC(C)CCCN(CC)CCO
- InChI: InChI=1S/C18H26ClN3O/c1-3-22(11-12-23)10-4-5-14(2)21-17-8-9-20-18-13-15(19)6-7-16(17)18/h6-9,13-14,23H,3-5,10-12H2,1-2H3,(H,20,21); Key:XXSMGPRMXLTPCZ-UHFFFAOYSA-N

Hydroxychloroquine, sold under the brand name Plaquenil among others, is a medication used to prevent and treat malaria in areas where malaria remains sensitive to chloroquine. Other uses include treatment of rheumatoid arthritis, lupus, and porphyria cutanea tarda. It is taken by mouth, often in the form of hydroxychloroquine sulfate.

Common side effects may include vomiting, headache, blurred vision, and muscle weakness. Severe side effects may include allergic reactions, retinopathy, and irregular heart rate. Although all risk cannot be excluded, it remains a treatment for rheumatic disease during pregnancy. Hydroxychloroquine is in the antimalarial and 4-aminoquinoline families of medication.

Hydroxychloroquine was approved for medical use in the United States in 1955. It is on the World Health Organization's List of Essential Medicines. In 2023, it was the 131st most commonly prescribed medication in the United States, with more than 4 million prescriptions.

Hydroxychloroquine has been studied for an ability to prevent and treat coronavirus disease 2019 (COVID-19), but clinical trials found it ineffective for this purpose and a possible risk of dangerous side effects. Among studies that deemed hydroxychloroquine intake to cause harmful side effects, a publication by The Lancet was retracted due to data flaws. The speculative use of hydroxychloroquine for COVID-19 threatened its availability for people with established indications.

== Medical uses ==
Hydroxychloroquine treats rheumatic disorders such as systemic lupus erythematosus, rheumatoid arthritis, and porphyria cutanea tarda, and certain infections such as Q fever and certain types of malaria. It is considered the first-line treatment for systemic lupus erythematosus. Certain types of malaria, resistant strains, and complicated cases require different or additional medication.

Hydroxychloroquine blocks the effects of some chemicals released in autoimmune diseases, and is used to treat inflammatory conditions.

It is widely used to treat primary Sjögren syndrome but does not appear to be effective. Hydroxychloroquine is widely used in the treatment of post-Lyme arthritis. It may have both an anti-spirochete activity and an anti-inflammatory activity, similar to the treatment of rheumatoid arthritis.

Hydroxychloroquine is the most frequently prescribed oral medication for Sjögren's disease. EULAR guidelines suggest it may be considered for frequent joint pain episodes, while not recommending it for dry eyes and dry mouth. Whether it works when used alone is disputed. A randomized trial in 2014 found no improvement over placebo in dryness, pain, or fatigue, although it lowered blood markers of inflammation and immune activity.

A later reanalysis of that trial suggested that patients with the most severe symptoms did benefit. A 2021 meta-analysis reported benefit for oral symptoms and inflammatory markers, and a large study in 2025 found greater response in patients positive for anti-SSA/Ro autoantibodies or rheumatoid factor.

Separately, two randomized trials in 2020 and 2026 found that hydroxychloroquine combined with leflunomide reduced systemic disease activity (effects on joints and internal organs, as opposed to dryness) versus placebo.

== Contraindications ==
The US FDA drug label advises that hydroxychloroquine should not be prescribed to individuals with known hypersensitivity to 4-aminoquinoline compounds. There are several other contraindications, and caution is required if the person considered for treatment has certain heart conditions, diabetes, or psoriasis.

== Adverse effects ==
Hydroxychloroquine has a narrow therapeutic index, meaning there is little difference between toxic and therapeutic doses. The most common adverse effects are nausea, stomach cramps, and diarrhea. Other common adverse effects include itching and headache. The most serious adverse effects affect the eye, with dose-related retinopathy as a concern even after hydroxychloroquine use is discontinued. Serious reported neuropsychiatric adverse effects of hydroxychloroquine use include agitation, mania, difficulty sleeping, hallucinations, psychosis, catatonia, paranoia, depression, and suicidal thoughts. In rare situations, hydroxychloroquine has been implicated in cases of serious skin reactions such as Stevens–Johnson syndrome, toxic epidermal necrolysis, and Drug reaction with eosinophilia and systemic symptoms. Reported blood abnormalities with its use include lymphopenia, eosinophilia, and atypical lymphocytosis.

For short-term treatment of acute malaria, adverse effects can include abdominal cramps, diarrhea, heart problems, reduced appetite, headache, nausea and vomiting. Other adverse effects noted with short-term use of Hydroxychloroquine include low blood sugar and QT interval prolongation. Idiosyncratic hypersensitivity reactions have occurred.

For prolonged treatment of lupus or rheumatoid arthritis, adverse effects include the acute symptoms, plus altered eye pigmentation, acne, anemia, bleaching of hair, blisters in mouth and eyes, blood disorders, cardiomyopathy, convulsions, vision difficulties, diminished reflexes, emotional changes, excessive coloring of the skin, hearing loss, hives, itching, liver problems or liver failure, loss of hair, muscle paralysis, weakness or atrophy, nightmares, psoriasis, reading difficulties, tinnitus, skin inflammation and scaling, skin rash, vertigo, weight loss, and occasionally urinary incontinence. Hydroxychloroquine can worsen existing cases of both psoriasis and porphyria.

Children may be especially vulnerable to developing adverse effects from hydroxychloroquine overdoses.

=== Eyes ===
One of the most serious side effects is retinopathy (generally with chronic use). People taking 400 mg of hydroxychloroquine or less per day generally have a negligible risk of macular toxicity, whereas the risk begins to increase when a person takes the medication over five years or has a cumulative dose of more than 1000 grams. The daily safe maximum dose for eye toxicity can be estimated from a person's height and weight. Macular toxicity is related to the total cumulative dose rather than the daily dose. Regular eye screening, even in the absence of visual symptoms, is recommended to begin when either of these risk factors occurs.

Toxicity from hydroxychloroquine may be seen in two distinct areas of the eye: the cornea and the macula. The cornea may become affected (relatively commonly) by an innocuous cornea verticillata or vortex keratopathy and is characterized by whorl-like corneal epithelial deposits. These changes bear no relationship to dosage and are usually reversible on cessation of hydroxychloroquine.

The macular changes are potentially serious. Advanced retinopathy is characterized by reduction of visual acuity and a "bull's eye" macular lesion which is absent in early involvement.

== Overdose ==
Overdoses of hydroxychloroquine are extremely rare, but extremely toxic. Eight people are known to have overdosed since the drug's introduction in the mid-1950s, of which three have died. Chloroquine has a risk of death in overdose in adults of about 20%, while hydroxychloroquine is estimated to be two or threefold less toxic.

Serious signs and symptoms of overdose generally occur within an hour of ingestion. These may include sleepiness, vision changes, seizures, coma, stopping of breathing, and heart problems such as ventricular fibrillation and low blood pressure. Loss of vision may be permanent. Low blood potassium, to levels of 1 to 2 mmol/L, may also occur. Cardiovascular abnormalities such as QRS complex widening and QT interval prolongation may also occur.

Treatment recommendations include early mechanical ventilation, heart monitoring, and activated charcoal. Supportive treatment with intravenous fluids and vasopressors may be required with epinephrine being the vasopressor of choice. Stomach pumping may also be used. Sodium bicarbonate and hypertonic saline may be used in cases of severe QRS complex widening. Seizures may be treated with benzodiazepines. Intravenous potassium chloride may be required, however this may result in high blood potassium later in the course of the disease. Dialysis does not appear to be useful.

=== Detection ===
Hydroxychloroquine may be quantified in plasma or serum to confirm a diagnosis of poisoning in hospitalized victims or in whole blood to assist in a forensic investigation of a case of sudden or unexpected death. Plasma or serum concentrations are usually in a range of 0.1-1.6 mg/L during therapy and 6–20 mg/L in cases of clinical intoxication, while blood levels of 20–100 mg/L have been observed in deaths due to acute overdosage.

== Interactions ==
The drug transfers into breast milk. There is no evidence that its use during pregnancy is harmful to the developing fetus and its use is not contraindicated in pregnancy.

The concurrent use of hydroxychloroquine and the antibiotic azithromycin appears to increase the risk for certain serious side effects with short-term use, such as an increased risk of chest pain, congestive heart failure, and mortality from cardiovascular causes. Care should be taken if combined with medication altering liver function as well as aurothioglucose (Solganal), cimetidine (Tagamet) or digoxin (Lanoxin). Hydroxychloroquine can increase plasma concentrations of penicillamine which may contribute to the development of severe side effects. It enhances hypoglycemic effects of insulin and oral hypoglycemic agents. Dose altering is recommended to prevent profound hypoglycemia. Antacids may decrease the absorption of hydroxychloroquine. Both neostigmine and pyridostigmine antagonize the action of hydroxychloroquine.

While there may be a link between hydroxychloroquine and hemolytic anemia in those with glucose-6-phosphate dehydrogenase deficiency, this risk may be low in those of African descent.

Specifically, the US Food and Drug Administration's (FDA) drug label for hydroxychloroquine lists the following drug interactions:

- Digoxin (wherein it may result in increased serum digoxin levels)
- Insulin or anti-diabetic medication (wherein it may enhance the effects of a hypoglycemic treatment)
- Drugs that prolong the QT interval such as methadone, and other arrhythmogenic drugs, as hydroxychloroquine prolongs the QT interval and may increase the risk of inducing serious abnormal heart rhythms (ventricular arrhythmias) if used concurrently.
- Mefloquine and other drugs known to lower the seizure threshold (co-administration with other antimalarials known to lower the convulsion threshold may increase risk of convulsions)
- Antiepileptics (concurrent use may impair the antiepileptic activity)
- Methotrexate (combined use is unstudied and may increase the frequency of side effects)
- Cyclosporin (wherein an increased plasma cyclosporin level was reported when used together).

== Pharmacology ==
=== Pharmacokinetics ===
Hydroxychloroquine has similar pharmacokinetics to chloroquine, with rapid gastrointestinal absorption, large distribution volume, and elimination by the kidneys; T_{max} is 2–4.5 hours. Cytochrome P450 enzymes (CYP2D6, 2C8, 3A4 and 3A5) metabolize hydroxychloroquine to N-desethylhydroxychloroquine. Both agents also inhibit CYP2D6 activity and may interact with other medications that depend on this enzyme.

=== Pharmacodynamics ===
Antimalarials are lipophilic weak bases and easily pass plasma membranes. The free base form accumulates in lysosomes (acidic cytoplasmic vesicles) and is then protonated, resulting in concentrations within lysosomes up to 1,000 times higher than in culture media. This increases the pH of the lysosome from four to six. Alteration in pH causes inhibition of lysosomal acidic proteases causing a diminished proteolysis effect. Higher pH within lysosomes causes decreased intracellular processing, glycosylation and secretion of proteins with many immunologic and nonimmunologic consequences. These effects are believed to be the cause of a decreased immune cell functioning such as chemotaxis, phagocytosis and superoxide production by neutrophils. Hydroxychloroquine is a weak diprotic base that can pass through the lipid cell membrane and preferentially concentrate in acidic cytoplasmic vesicles. The higher pH of these vesicles in macrophages or other antigen-presenting cells limits the association of autoantigenic (any) peptides with class II MHC molecules in the compartment for peptide loading and/or the subsequent processing and transport of the peptide-MHC complex to the cell membrane.

=== Mechanism of action ===
Hydroxychloroquine increases lysosomal pH in antigen-presenting cells by two mechanisms: As a weak base, it is a proton acceptor and via this chemical interaction, its accumulation in lysozymes raises the intralysosomal pH, but this mechanism does not fully account for the effect of hydroxychloroquine on pH. Additionally, in parasites that are susceptible to hydroxychloroquine, it interferes with the endocytosis and proteolysis of hemoglobin and inhibits the activity of lysosomal enzymes, thereby raising the lysosomal pH by more than two orders of magnitude over the weak base effect alone. In 2003, a novel mechanism was described wherein hydroxychloroquine inhibits stimulation of the toll-like receptor (TLR) 9 family receptors. TLRs are cellular receptors for microbial products that induce inflammatory responses through activation of the innate immune system.

As with other quinoline antimalarial drugs, the antimalarial mechanism of action of quinine has not been fully resolved. The most accepted model is based on hydrochloroquinine and involves the inhibition of hemozoin biocrystallization, which facilitates the aggregation of cytotoxic heme. Free cytotoxic heme accumulates in the parasites, causing death.

Hydroxychloroquine increases the risk of low blood sugar through several mechanisms. These include decreased clearance of the hormone insulin from the blood, increased insulin sensitivity, and increased release of insulin from the pancreas.

== History ==
After World War I, the German government sought alternatives to quinine as an anti-malarial. Chloroquine, a synthetic analogue with the same mechanism of action was discovered in 1934, by Hans Andersag and coworkers at the Bayer laboratories. This was introduced into clinical practice in 1947 for the prophylactic treatment of malaria. Researchers subsequently attempted to discover structural analogs with superior properties and one of these was hydroxychloroquine.

=== Chemical synthesis ===
The first synthesis of hydroxychloroquine was disclosed in a patent filed by Sterling Drug in 1949. In the final step, 4,7-dichloroquinoline was reacted with a primary amine which in turn had been made from the chloro-ketone shown:

== Manufacturing ==
It is frequently sold as a sulfate salt known as hydroxychloroquine sulfate. In the sulfate salt form, 200 mg is equal to 155 mg of the pure form.

Brand names of hydroxychloroquine include Plaquenil, Hydroquin, Axemal (in India), Dolquine, Quensyl, and Quinoric.

== COVID-19 ==
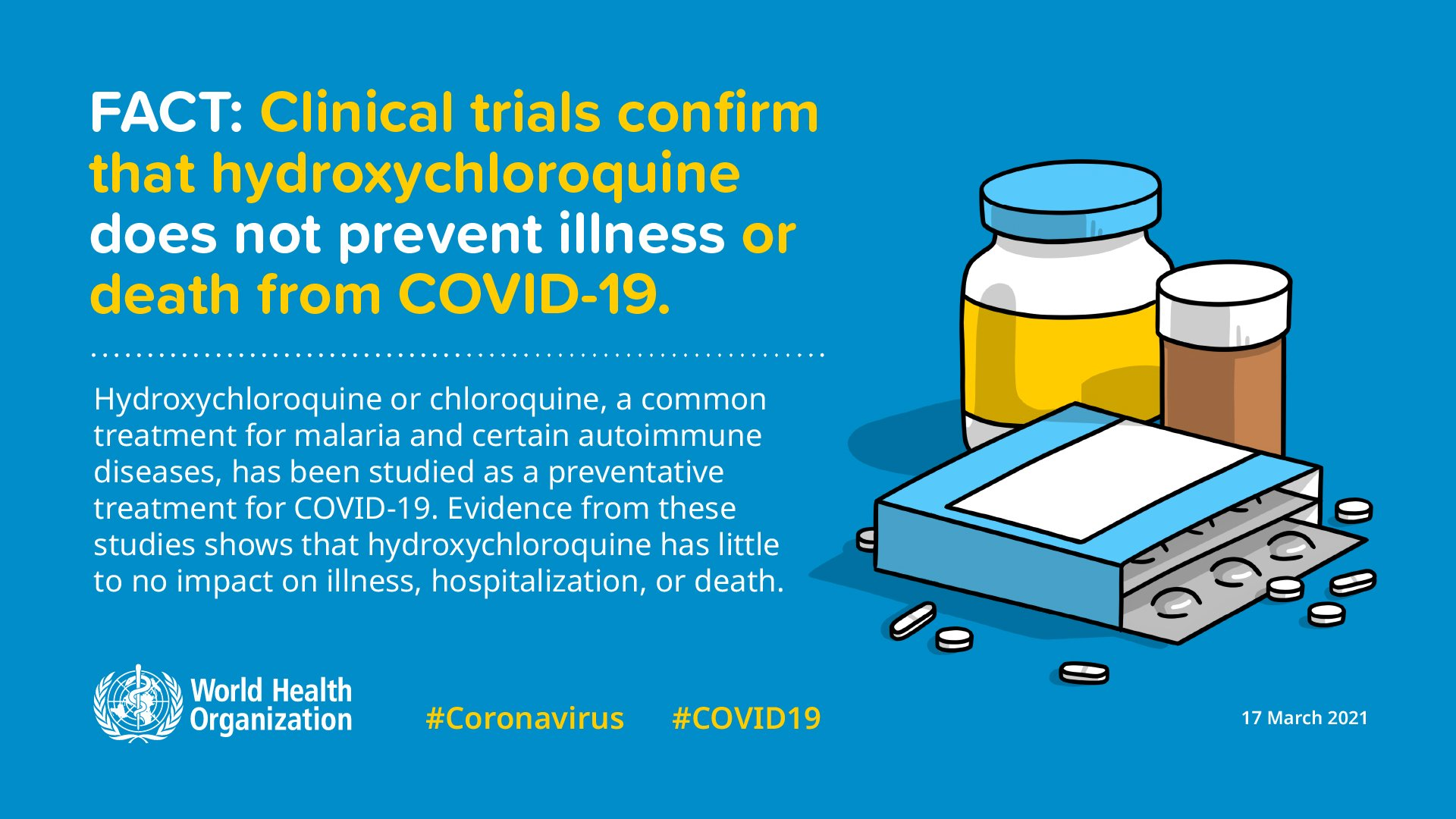
A World Health Organization infographic that states that hydroxychloroquine does not prevent illness or death from COVID-19

Chloroquine and hydroxychloroquine are anti-malarial medications also used against some auto-immune diseases. Chloroquine, along with hydroxychloroquine, was an early experimental treatment for COVID-19. Neither drug has been useful to prevent or treat SARS-CoV-2 infection. Administration of chloroquine or hydroxychloroquine to COVID-19 patients, either as monotherapies or in conjunction with azithromycin, has been associated with deleterious outcomes, such as QT prolongation. Scientific evidence does not substantiate the efficacy of hydroxychloroquine, with or without the addition of azithromycin, in the therapeutic management of COVID-19.

Cleavage of the SARS-CoV-2 S2 spike protein required for viral entry into cells can be accomplished by proteases TMPRSS2 located on the cell membrane, or by cathepsins (primarily cathepsin L) in endolysosomes. Hydroxychloroquine inhibits the action of cathepsin L in endolysosomes, but because cathepsin L cleavage is minor compared to TMPRSS2 cleavage, hydroxychloroquine does little to inhibit SARS-CoV-2 infection.

Several countries initially used chloroquine or hydroxychloroquine for treatment of persons hospitalized with COVID-19 (as of March 2020), though the drug was not formally approved through clinical trials. From April to June 2020, there was an emergency use authorization for their use in the United States, and was used off label for potential treatment of the disease. On 24 April 2020, citing the risk of "serious heart rhythm problems", the FDA posted a caution against using the drug for COVID-19 "outside of the hospital setting or a clinical trial".

Their use was withdrawn as a possible treatment for COVID-19 infection when it proved to have no benefit for hospitalized patients with severe COVID-19 illness in the international Solidarity trial and UK RECOVERY Trial. On 15 June 2020, the FDA revoked its emergency use authorization, stating that it was "no longer reasonable to believe" that the drug was effective against COVID-19 or that its benefits outweighed "known and potential risks". In late 2020, the National Institutes of Health issued treatment guidelines recommending against the use of hydroxychloroquine for COVID-19 except as part of a clinical trial.

In 2021, hydroxychloroquine was part of the recommended treatment for mild cases in India.

In 2020, the speculative use of hydroxychloroquine for COVID-19 threatened its availability for people with established indications (malaria and auto-immune diseases).
