= Platform trial =

Type of clinical trial

A platform trial is a type of prospective, disease-focused, adaptive, randomized clinical trial (RCT) that compares multiple, simultaneous and possibly differently-timed interventions against a single, constant control group. As a disease-focused trial design (compared to an intervention-focused), platform trials attempt to answer the question "which therapy will best treat this disease". Platform trials are unique in their utilization of both: a common control group and their opportunity to alter the therapies it investigates during its active enrollment phase. Platform trials commonly take advantage of Bayesian statistics, but may incorporate elements of frequentist statistics and/or machine learning.

== Purpose ==
Platform trials can be a particularly useful design when researchers predict that multiple therapies that would become available at different times require investigation. For example, when the COVID-19 pandemic began, researchers predicted that there would eventually be multiple different therapies that could be investigated, but that these therapies would be discovered at different times in the pandemic timeline, therefore making a platform trial a useful design. Similar to COVID-19, platform trials have found use in oncology, alzheimer's disease and pneumonia research. Platform trials can be a superior design compared to simple 2-arm clinical trials when multiple therapies need investigation, because it only requires a single control group. This means that platform trials can be conducted with fewer enrolled patients than a set of potentially redundant control groups in a series of separate 2-arm trials. This in turn allows for results to be published sooner for time-sensitive diseases, and for fewer patients to be exposed to the risks of a clinical trial. Platform trials may be appropriate for phase II-IV trails.

== Design elements ==
=== Master protocol ===
Platform trials, like any clinical trial, have many elements that must be established before starting enrollment. While platform trials have the ability to alter their therapies of interest there are still many elements of these trials that remain constant and regulated. Such common, stable elements of platform trials described in the master protocol include: qualified trial staff members, trial sites, recruitment criteria, enrollment procedures, pre-set criteria for adding/discontinuing new therapies, adverse event reporting, communication plans, and statistical analysis plans. The master protocol is submitted to the IRB and once approved, only arm-specific appendices need to be submitted for Institutional Review Board (IRB) approval in the event of changes to the trial arms. Establishing a stable master protocol with adaptive therapy arms allows for faster, more efficient trial execution.

Platform trials are often large, multi-site investigations and as a result, master protocols frequently try to identify common human and physical infrastructure to maximize resource availability and efficiency. Examples of this include identifying/creating a single IRB to review the trial for all sites, creating a single database for collecting data, and creating a single randomization mechanism for all enrolled patients.

=== Common control group ===
One of the defining aspects of a platform trial is the shared control group that all interventional arms are compared to. Whereas a conventional RCT would generally have half of all enrolled patients in the control group; platform trials have a higher total number of patients in various interventional groups. This allows for fewer patients to be enrolled which saves money and accelerates completion time. A common statistical tool for determining allocation ratios, Dunnett's test, suggests that $n \sqrt{t}$ patients should be allocated to the control group, where $n$ is the sample size for each of the active arms and $t$ is their number. As the number of arms increase, the ratio of patients allocated to control also increases. This results in the control group having a higher proportion of allocated patients than any one arm though platform trials still allow for more total patients to be in intervention arms than multiple 2-arm RCTs.

While the control group is not necessarily designed to change in the way that the treatment arms are, because platform trials can run for long periods of time, control groups may have to evolve to stay current with standard of care. When this is the case, or if there is a change to patient demographics with time, later analysis of the trial must be careful to consider comparing investigational patients to only the appropriate subset of control patients.

=== Adaptive intervention groups ===
The second defining aspect of a platform is that the therapies under investigation can change during the active enrollment phase of a trial. By comparison, conventional RCTs must specify the therapies under investigation before active enrollment and then discontinuation of a therapy results in discontinuation of the entire trial. Platform designs allow for addition and/or discontinuation of therapy arms. Importantly, the addition or discontinuation of an arm must follow pre-set protocols such as reaching a certain demonstrated efficacy or being recommended by a set panel of experts. There are frequently caps to the number of arms that can be active at once which are pre-determined by the research team. The number of possible arms is influenced by considerations of cost, time available for the trial, operational feasibility, complications with organization large quantities of patient data and the number of total patients available for enrollment. While an arm most frequently represents a single therapy, advanced designs may have multiple therapies in a single arm. When this is the case, one arm may have different therapies in different therapy classes (i.e. one antibiotic and one immunomodulator). Another advanced strategy is for each arm to utilize the same treatments, but with each arm representing a different sequence of intervention administration. Advance trials may also be designed such that some arms are only activated depending on the results of other arms. For example, a higher-dose arm may only be activated if a lower-dose arm shows few side effects but also low efficacy.

Unlike conventional RCTs, intervention arms do not necessarily need to start at the same time chronologically. This feature is particularly useful when investigating diseases that have new therapies being discovered regularly since these new therapies can be added to the trial without needing to start a new trial each time a therapy is discovered.

=== Response-adaptive randomization ===
Response-adaptive randomization is not a necessary component of platform trials but unique aspects of platforms allow for this feature to be incorporated. Response-adaptive randomization refers to the capability of redistributing the patient allocation ratio when one arm is showing superior/inferior outcomes compared to other arms after an interim analysis. Allocation ratios can therefor be adjusted to put more patients into more successful arms; however the ratio of patients randomized to the control group does not change. Allocation ratios are determined through a mix of empirical interim evidence and simulation modeling. Care must be taken, especially early in the trial when limited sample sizes are available, to avoid extreme swings in allocation ratios as such swings could cause early biasing of data.

== Limitations ==
While platform trials offer many advantages for investigating a single disease, their adaptive nature and potential for numerous and complicated arms may limit their applicability and feasibility. Platforms require a large number of experts for trial design, Data Monitoring and Safety Boards and operations leading to high cost and communication complexity. The long duration of platform trials may necessitate updates to the standard of care in the control group, complicating analysis. Further, care must be taken to ensure that the data from arms added later are compared to appropriate sub-sections of the control group, increasing statistical complexity. Publishing results of terminated arms can also be complicated if the whole trial has not yet been completed, as shared data in the trial may still need to remain blinded. Additionally, the complexity of platform designs—often involving multiple sponsors and funding sources as well as changing treatment arms—can make them difficult to register in standardized databases. Platform trials require long planning times, making them unsuitable for therapies needing immediate investigation. Funding can be complicated when different pharmaceutical companies are involved, and the ill-defined trial lengths make them less appealing to federal funding agencies.

== See also ==
- Clinical Trial
- Adaptive Clinical Trial
- Clinical Study Design
- Bayesian Experimental Design
- AGILE
