= Convalescent plasma =

Blood plasma from disease survivor

Convalescent plasma is the blood plasma collected from a survivor of an infectious disease. This plasma contains antibodies specific to a pathogen and can be used therapeutically by providing passive immunity when transfusing it to a newly infected patient with the same condition. Convalescent plasma can be transfused as it has been collected or become the source material for hyperimmune serum or anti-pathogen monoclonal antibodies; the latter consists exclusively of IgG, while convalescent plasma also includes IgA and IgM. Collection is typically achieved by apheresis, but in low-to-middle income countries, the treatment can be administered as convalescent whole blood.

== How it works ==
=== Antibodies ===
Specific antibodies to a pathogen are thought to be the primary driver of clinical benefit from convalescent plasma. In the case of viral pathogens, the subset of antibodies that retain most of the activity is the one that drives viral neutralization, i.e. neutralizing antibodies, which can be quantified in a viral neutralization assay. This belief is based on dose-response clinical studies demonstrating that clinical benefit is directly related to the content of neutralizing antibodies, and mechanistic studies that have established the antiviral activity of antibodies in convalescent plasma. In addition to higher antibody concentrations being more effective, the timing of therapy is essential. Preparations are typically most effective when given prophylactically or early in the disease course (i.e. until pathogen replication persists or until the infected host's endogenous immune response develops).

=== Other components of convalescent plasma ===
In addition to antibodies, convalescent plasma includes a mix of many different proteins and nonprotein factors that can occur in healthy individuals as well as develop in parallel with convalescence. These compounds may affect infection, coagulation, and inflammation independently of the effect of anti-pathogen antibodies. Because convalescent plasma therapy is generally safe, and the effects of neutralizing antibodies dominate the therapeutic response, the current understanding of these potential additional effects is limited and constitutes an area of ongoing research.

== Historical use of convalescent plasma ==
In 1890, Emil von Behring and Shibasaburo Kitasato used convalescent serum obtained from large mammals to treat infectious diseases and found that it was particularly effective at preventing and treating diphtheria. Convalescent serum and plasma differ in that the former has all the coagulation components intact, but both are comparable regarding their antibody content. Hence, the older literature is focused on serum while today most preparations use plasma. Following the discovery by von Behring and Kitasato, antibody therapy garnered support worldwide as a treatment for infections. Von Behring was awarded the first Nobel Prize in Physiology or Medicine in 1901 for his discoveries.

Before the development of antimicrobial treatment in the 1930s, antibody therapy in the form of serum therapy were the primary means of treating many bacterial and viral infections. This treatment appears to have reduced the mortality of meningococcal meningitis, pneumonia, and erysipelas. Additionally, antibody therapy seems to have been used successfully to prevent infection after exposure to measles, mumps, and chickenpox.

=== 1918 Influenza pandemic ===
The 1918 Spanish influenza pandemic was caused by an H1N1 influenza virus of avian origin, and around 500 million people, or one-third of the world's population, became infected with this virus. The Spanish influenza pandemic was the first pandemic in which convalescent plasma was used as a therapy. A 2006 meta-analysis of eight studies from the Spanish influenza pandemic, including 1,703 patients, found that infected patients who received convalescent plasma had a 21% lower absolute mortality risk than patients not treated with convalescent plasma (16% vs. 37%). Consistent with the general treatment principles of antiviral therapy, the most significant clinical and mortality benefits were noted among patients receiving convalescent serum in the early stages of the disease course.

== Modern use of convalescent plasma ==
After the introduction of antibiotics, the use of convalescent serum or plasma as a therapy for infectious diseases has been restricted mainly to replacement therapy for patients with immunoglobulin deficiencies or in the context of viral epidemics or pandemics for which no widely available antiviral could be repurposed. Modern use has also included several randomized controlled trials providing conclusive evidence of efficacy. Selected viral epidemics or pandemics in which convalescent plasma has been used are reviewed below.

=== Argentine hemorrhagic fever ===
First identified in 1958, Argentine hemorrhagic fever is a rodent-borne illness caused by the arenavirus Junin that is endemic to the humid pampas of Argentina. Convalescent plasma has been used during Argentine hemorrhagic fever epidemics; a double-blind, randomized clinical trial conducted from 1974 to 1978 demonstrated that patients treated with convalescent plasma within eight days of disease onset had a 15.4% lower absolute mortality rate than patients who received control plasma without neutralizing antibodies to Argentine hemorrhagic fever virus (1.1% vs. 16.5%). Comparable results were described in subsequent outbreaks of Argentine hemorrhagic fever.

=== 2003 SARS epidemic (SARS-CoV-1) ===
In 2003, a novel coronavirus SARS-CoV-1 led to an epidemic of the severe acute respiratory syndrome. Convalescent plasma was used to treat SARS; in a retrospective analysis from Hong Kong that included 80 patients, early convalescent plasma treatment (14 days between the onset of symptoms and the transfusion date) was associated with an improved prognosis vs late transfusion (after 14 days since symptom onset) in terms of a higher hospital discharge rate by day 22 (58% vs 16%). A review and meta-analysis that included eight observational studies (214 total patients) with SARS found a mortality benefit associated with convalescent plasma treatment. Further studies were not conducted because the pandemic was extinguished.

=== 2009–2010 influenza pandemic ===
In 2009, a particular influenza strain A(H1N1)pdm09 that evaded seasonal flu vaccines caused an influenza pandemic, which was referred to as the swine flu pandemic. Convalescent plasma was used to treat individuals with severe H1N1 infections requiring intensive care. Despite usage very late in the disease course, patients treated with convalescent plasma had reduced respiratory viral burden, reduced serum cytokine responses, and reduced mortality.

=== 2012–2015 MERS epidemics ===
Middle East respiratory syndrome (MERS) is a viral respiratory infection caused by the Middle East respiratory syndrome-related coronavirus (MERS-CoV), which is believed to have originated from bats. The first identified case occurred in June 2012 in Jeddah, Saudi Arabia, and most cases have occurred in the Arabian Peninsula. Convalescent plasma therapy has been used to treat MERS with mixed results; initial case reports and case series in the MERS epidemic failed to show a clinical benefit for patients transfused with convalescent plasma containing uncharacterized neutralizing antibody titers. Consistent with the principle that higher antibody content in convalescent plasma results in improved efficacy, a subsequent study demonstrated that transfusion of convalescent plasma containing a high MERS-CoV neutralizing antibody titer resulted in detectable concentrations of antibodies in the blood of the recipient (seroconversion). However, seroconversion was not achieved in patients who received convalescent plasma with a low neutralizing antibody titer. These findings highlight a challenge of convalescent plasma therapy, namely, that recovered survivors of viral diseases may not produce high-titer neutralizing antibodies, and thus not all convalescent plasma is equally potent.

=== 2013 Ebola epidemic ===
Ebola virus disease was discovered in 1976 when two consecutive outbreaks of fatal hemorrhagic fever occurred in different parts of Central Africa. Convalescent plasma treatment was used during the 2013–2016 Ebola outbreak; a small nonrandomized study in Sierra Leone revealed significantly longer survival for patients treated with convalescent whole blood compared to patients receiving standard treatment. Furthermore, two patients with Ebola who were transferred to the U.S. were treated with convalescent plasma, and an experimental small interfering RNA drug, and both survived their infections.

=== 2019 COVID-19 pandemic ===
In 2019, a novel coronavirus, severe acute respiratory syndrome coronavirus 2 (SARS-CoV-2), causing coronavirus disease 2019 (COVID-19) spread rapidly around the globe after first being identified in Wuhan, China. In early 2020, convalescent plasma started to be used in isolated cases and small series in China and Italy. Convalescent plasma therapy was deployed at scale in the United States through a Mayo Clinic-led Expanded Access Program for convalescent plasma and a subsequent Emergency Use Authorization issued by the United States Food & Drug Administration. Data from the Expanded Access Program demonstrated that among patients who were not mechanically ventilated, patients transfused with high-titer convalescent plasma had lower mortality than patients who received low-titer convalescent plasma (14.2% vs. 22.2%). Relatively early during the pandemic, several randomized controlled trials concluded that convalescent plasma therapy was not effective for COVID-19, but most of them focused on patients already seropositive or late in the disease course and/or used plasma units with insufficient antibody levels. Furthermore, there were methodological problems with some of the major trials raising concerns about the validity of negative results with regards to convalescent plasma efficacy. Randomized controlled trials that instead focused on administering high-titer convalescent plasma early after diagnosis found that convalescent plasma treatment reduced hospital admission by ~50-80%, which is in line with results achieved with monoclonal antibodies and small chemical antivirals. Similarly, a randomized controlled trial that administered high-titer convalescent plasma in patients requiring mechanical ventilation found an absolute reduction in mortality of 14% in patients who received convalescent plasma within 48 hours of the initiation of mechanical ventilation. Meta-analyses found that convalescent plasma treatment is associated with a mortality benefit, particularly if it contains high antibody levels, is administered early, and in immunocompromised patients. An epidemiologic analysis of convalescent plasma use and mortality in the United States showed a strong inverse correlation, providing strong evidence of efficacy at a population level. From this data, it was estimated that the deployment of convalescent plasma had resulted in approximately 100,000 fewer deaths than had no plasma been used in the USA.

In the post-vaccine COVID-19 pandemic, a resurgence in the usage of convalescent plasma occurred starting in the spring of 2022, when the SARS-CoV-2 variant Omicron sublineages proved non-responsive to all anti-spike monoclonal antibody treatments authorized, and concerns emerged about contraindications and chronic exposure to small-chemical antivirals which had never been studied in immunocompromised patients at that point. Considering the urgent need to treat immunocompromised patients who were not protected after vaccination, the United States Food & Drug Administration re-authorized convalescent plasma for these patients; accordingly, convalescent plasma was recommended in guidelines issued by the Infectious Disease Society of America and the European Conference on Infections in Leukemia. In the context of the wide deployment of COVID-19 vaccines, a unique product that can be collected from convalescent vaccinees, dubbed "hybrid plasma" or "Vax-plasma" has been of interest; such double status creates heterologous immunity able to cross-react against any SARS-CoV-2 variant so far. In India, Hyperion plasma treatment was introduced to the government by its advisor Ashwin Srivastava of Sapio Analytics with researchers from Redcliffe. The treatment optimizes standard convalescent plasma treatment by pairing it with adjuvant negative ion therapy.

An online petition was launched on April 27, 2022, asking the World Health Organization to revise its guidelines issued in December 2021, which discouraged convalescent plasma usage based on the evidence available until July 2021.

== Regulatory status ==
In the European Directorate for the Quality of Medicines and HealthCare guidelines for blood component manufacturing, no monography exists for convalescent plasma yet as of 2022. Outside clinical trials, the only way thus far to prescribe convalescent plasma is so-called compassionate usage, a procedure which requires authorization by a local ethical committee. In the United States, the use of convalescent plasma for the treatment of COVID-19 remains under Food & Drug Administration Emergency Use Authorization.
