= COVID-19 drug repurposing research =

Drug repurposing research related to COVID-19

Drug repositioning (also known as drug repurposing, re-profiling, re-tasking, or therapeutic switching) is the repurposing of an approved drug for the treatment of a different disease or medical condition than that for which it was originally developed. This is one line of scientific research which is being pursued to develop safe and effective COVID-19 treatments. Other research directions include the development of a COVID-19 vaccine and convalescent plasma transfusion.

Several existing antiviral medications, previously developed or used as treatments for severe acute respiratory syndrome (SARS), Middle East respiratory syndrome (MERS), HIV/AIDS, and malaria, have been researched as potential COVID-19 treatments, with some moving into clinical trials.

In a statement to the journal Nature Biotechnology in February 2020, US National Institutes of Health Viral Ecology Unit chief Vincent Munster said, "The general genomic layout and the general replication kinetics and the biology of the MERS, SARS and [SARS-CoV-2] viruses are very similar, so testing drugs which target relatively generic parts of these coronaviruses is a logical step".

== Background ==
Outbreaks of novel emerging infections such as COVID-19 pose unique challenges to discover treatments appropriate for clinical use, given the small amount of time available for drug discovery. Since the process of developing and licensing a new drug for COVID-19 was expected to pose a particularly long delay, researchers have been probing the existing compendium of approved antivirals and other drugs as a cost-effective strategy in the meantime. In early 2020 hundreds of hospitals and universities began their own trials of existing safe drugs with repurposing potential against COVID-19.

Drug repurposing usually requires three steps before taking the drug across the development pipeline: recognition of the right drug; systematic evaluation of the drug effect in clinical models; and estimation of usefulness in phase II clinical trials.

One approach used in repositioning is to look for drugs that act through virus-related targets such as the RNA genome (i.e. remdesivir). Another approach concerns drugs acting through polypeptide packing (i.e. lopinavir).

The rush to publish papers about the pandemic resulted in some scandals of inaccurate scientific publications. Some early studies reporting the efficacy of hydroxychloroquine and remdesivir convinced drug agencies such as Food and Drug Administration (FDA) and European Medicines Agency to approve the off-label use by issuing Emergency Use Authorizations which were later revoked as new evidence showed these drugs have no effect on the course of COVID-19. These false-positive results can be explained in terms of the base-rate fallacy and the rapid changes in clinical guidance regarding COVID-19 treatment could have been avoided if mechanistic evidence for and against repurposing candidates were carefully assessed and the standard evidence amalgamation tools such as meta-analysis were routinely applied.

== Monoclonal antibodies ==
Monoclonal antibodies under investigation for repurposing include anti-IL-6 agents (tocilizumab) and anti-IL-8 (BMS-986253). (This is in parallel to novel monoclonal antibody drugs developed specifically for COVID-19.)

Mavrilimumab is a human monoclonal antibody that inhibits human granulocyte macrophage colony-stimulating factor receptor (GM-CSF-R). It has been studied to see if it can improve the prognosis for patients with COVID-19 pneumonia and systemic hyperinflammation. One small study indicated some beneficial effects of treatment with mavrilimumab compared with those who were not.

In January 2021, the UK National Health Service issued guidance that the immune modulating drugs tocilizumab and sarilumab were beneficial when given promptly to people with COVID-19 admitted to intensive care, following research which found a reduction in the risk of death by 24%.

=== Tocilizumab ===
Tocilizumab, sold under the brand name Actemra among others, is an immunosuppressive drug, used for the treatment of rheumatoid arthritis, systemic juvenile idiopathic arthritis, polyarticular juvenile idiopathic arthritis, giant cell arteritis, cytokine release syndrome, COVID‑19, and systemic sclerosis-associated interstitial lung disease (SSc-ILD). It is a recombinant humanized monoclonal antibody of the immunoglobulin IgG1 subclass against the interleukin-6 receptor (IL-6R). Interleukin 6 (IL-6) is a cytokine that plays an important role in immune response and is implicated in the pathogenesis of many diseases, such as autoimmune diseases, multiple myeloma and prostate cancer. Tocilizumab was jointly developed by Osaka University and Chugai, and was licensed in 2003 by Hoffmann-La Roche.

Tocilizumab was approved for medical use in the European Union in January 2009, and in the United States in January 2010.

== Anticoagulants ==
Medications to prevent blood clotting have been suggested for treatment, and anticoagulant therapy with low-molecular-weight heparin appears to be associated with better outcomes in severe COVID-19 showing signs of coagulopathy (elevated D-dimer). Several anticoagulants have been tested in Italy, with low-molecular-weight heparin being widely used to treat patients, prompting the Italian Medicines Agency to publish guidelines on its use.

Scientists have identified an ability of heparin to bind to the spike protein of the SARS-CoV-2 virus, neutralising it, and proposed the drug as a possible antiviral.

A multicenter study on 300 patients researching the use of enoxaparin sodium at prophylaxis and therapeutic dosages was announced in Italy on 14 April.

The anticoagulant dipyridamole is proposed as a treatment for COVID-19, and a clinical trial is underway.

== Antidepressants ==
Many antidepressants have anti-inflammatory properties. An observational study in Paris area hospitals found that COVID-19 patients admitted to the hospital who were already taking an antidepressant had 44% less risk of intubation or death. The potential mechanisms how fluvoxamine and fluoxetin are contributing to prevent the development of severe respiratory symptoms of COVID-19 by protecting the type 2 lung alveolar cells have been summarized in a review in March 2022.

=== Fluvoxamine ===
In October 2021, the TOGETHER trial, a large clinical trial in Brazil, reported that treating high-risk outpatients with an early diagnosis of COVID-19 with 100 mg fluvoxamine twice daily for 10 days reduced by up to about 65% the risk of hospitalization. The effect was reduced to about 32% with low adherence, possibly due to intolerance. There was also a reduction in the number of deaths by up to about 90% with high adherence. The drug was studied because of its anti-inflammatory effects, but the mechanism of action against COVID-19 remains uncertain.

On 16 December, the NIH found that use of fluvoxamine did not impact incidence of covid-related hospitalizations and considered the evidence insufficient to recommend either for or against the drug.

On 23 December, under very low certainty evidence, the Ontario clinical practice guideline suggested considering the drug to treat mildly ill patients within 7 days of symptom onset.

In May 2022, based on a review of available scientific evidence, the US Food and Drug Administration (FDA) declined a request to issue an Emergency Use Authorization (EUA) for fluvoxamine to treat COVID-19, saying that the data were not sufficient to conclude that it may be effective in treating non-hospitalized people with COVID-19 to prevent serious illness or hospitalization. University of Minnesota professor David Boulware, who filed the EUA application, said that "the standard that they were holding for fluvoxamine was a different standard than the other big pharma trials, with Paxlovid and molnupiravir and the monoclonals."

== Antioxidants ==
=== Acetylcysteine (NAC) ===
Acetylcysteine was considered as a possible treatment for COVID-19.

== Antiparasitics ==
The idea of repurposing host-directed drugs for antiviral therapy has experienced a renaissance. In some cases the research has highlighted fundamental limitations to their use for the treatment of acute RNA virus infections. Antiparasitics that have been investigated include chloroquine, hydroxychloroquine, mefloquine, ivermectin, and atovaquone.

=== Chloroquine and hydroxychloroquine ===
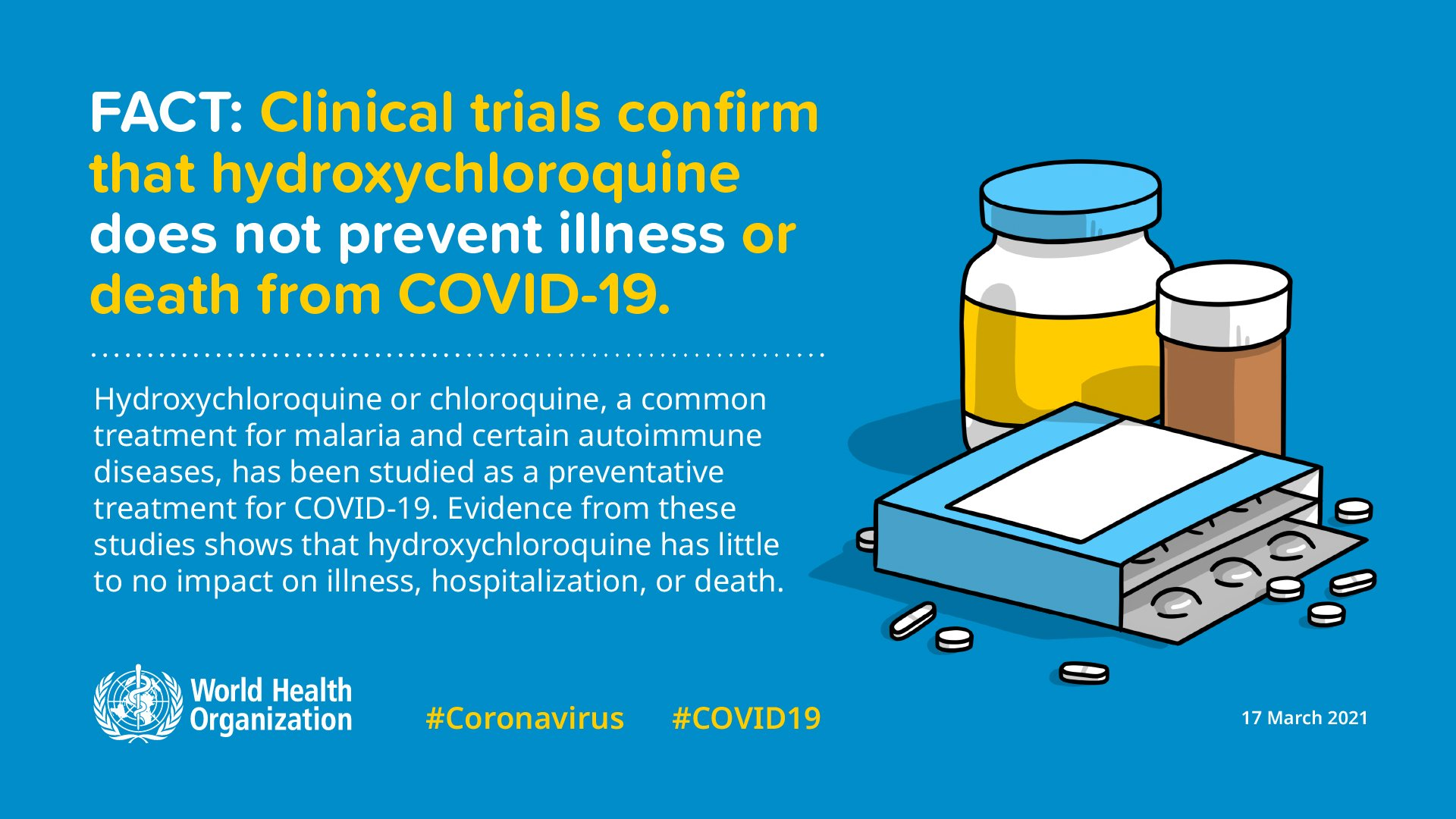
A World Health Organization infographic that states that hydroxychloroquine does not prevent illness or death from COVID-19

Chloroquine and hydroxychloroquine are anti-malarial medications also used against some auto-immune diseases. Chloroquine, along with hydroxychloroquine, was an early experimental treatment for COVID-19. Neither drug has been useful to prevent or treat SARS-CoV-2 infection. Administration of chloroquine or hydroxychloroquine to COVID-19 patients, either as monotherapies or in conjunction with azithromycin, has been associated with deleterious outcomes, such as QT prolongation. Scientific evidence does not substantiate the efficacy of hydroxychloroquine, with or without the addition of azithromycin, in the therapeutic management of COVID-19.

Cleavage of the SARS-CoV-2 S2 spike protein required for viral entry into cells can be accomplished by proteases TMPRSS2 located on the cell membrane, or by cathepsins (primarily cathepsin L) in endolysosomes. Hydroxychloroquine inhibits the action of cathepsin L in endolysosomes, but because cathepsin L cleavage is minor compared to TMPRSS2 cleavage, hydroxychloroquine does little to inhibit SARS-CoV-2 infection.

Several countries initially used chloroquine or hydroxychloroquine for treatment of persons hospitalized with COVID-19 (as of March 2020), though the drug was not formally approved through clinical trials. From April to June 2020, there was an emergency use authorization for their use in the United States, and was used off label for potential treatment of the disease. On 24 April 2020, citing the risk of "serious heart rhythm problems", the FDA posted a caution against using the drug for COVID-19 "outside of the hospital setting or a clinical trial".

Their use was withdrawn as a possible treatment for COVID-19 infection when it proved to have no benefit for hospitalized patients with severe COVID-19 illness in the international Solidarity trial and UK RECOVERY Trial. On 15 June 2020, the FDA revoked its emergency use authorization, stating that it was "no longer reasonable to believe" that the drug was effective against COVID-19 or that its benefits outweighed "known and potential risks". In late 2020, the National Institutes of Health issued treatment guidelines recommending against the use of hydroxychloroquine for COVID-19 except as part of a clinical trial.

In 2021, hydroxychloroquine was part of the recommended treatment for mild cases in India.

In 2020, the speculative use of hydroxychloroquine for COVID-19 threatened its availability for people with established indications (malaria and auto-immune diseases).

=== Ivermectin ===
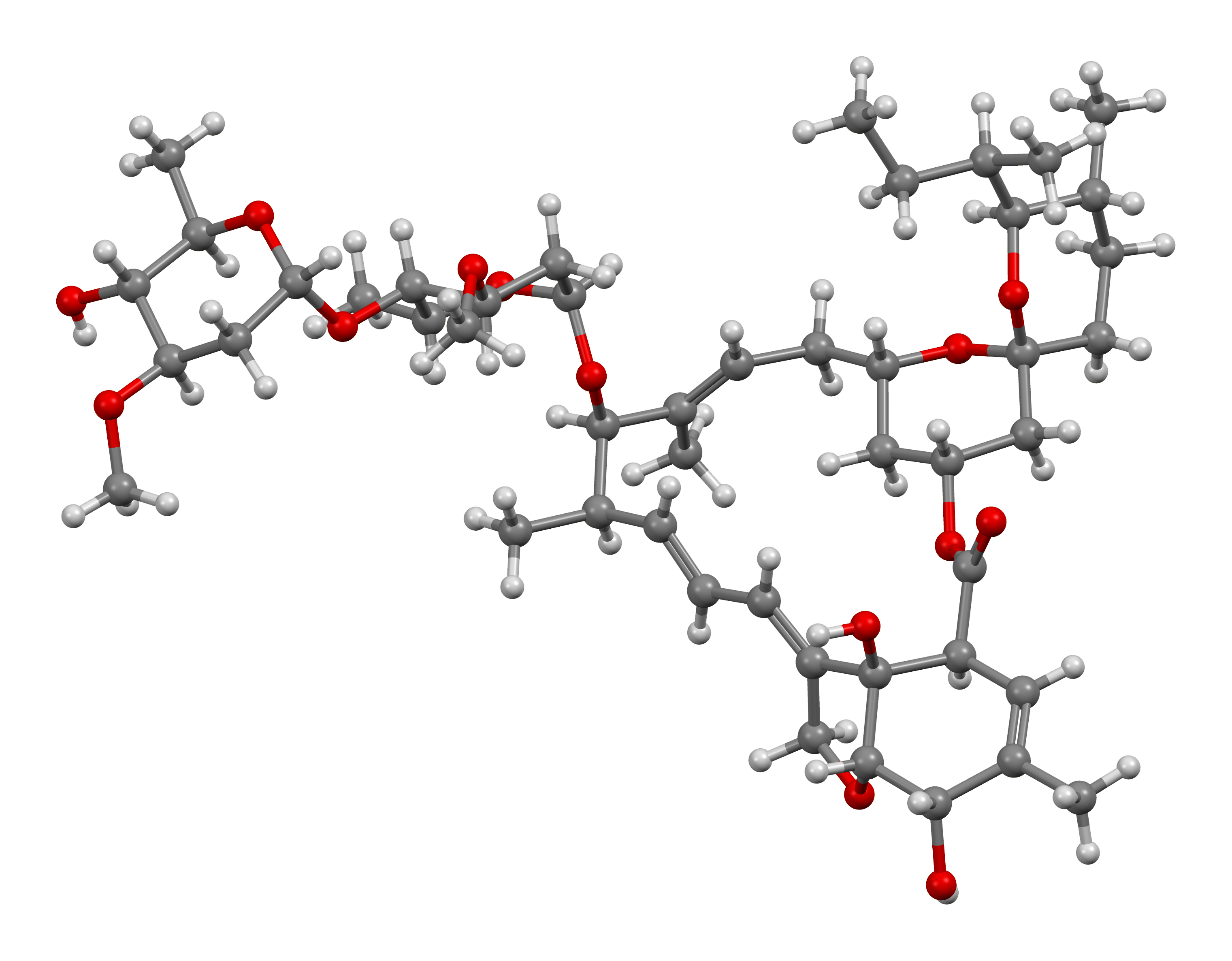
Ball-and-stick model of Ivermectin

Ivermectin is an antiparasitic drug that is well established for use in animals and people. The World Health Organization (WHO), the European Medicines Agency (EMA), the United States Food and Drug Administration (FDA), and the Infectious Diseases Society of America (IDSA) all do not advise using ivermectin in an attempt to treat or prevent COVID-19.

Early in the COVID-19 pandemic, laboratory research suggested ivermectin might have a role in preventing or treating COVID-19. Online misinformation campaigns and advocacy boosted the drug's profile among the public. While scientists and physicians largely remained skeptical, some nations adopted ivermectin as part of their pandemic-control efforts. Some people, desperate to use ivermectin without a prescription, took veterinary preparations, which led to shortages of supplies of ivermectin for animal treatment. The FDA responded to this situation by saying "You are not a horse. You are not a cow. Seriously, y'all. Stop it", in a tweet to draw attention to the issue, for which they were later sued by three ivermectin-prescribing doctors.

Subsequent research failed to confirm the utility of ivermectin for COVID-19, and in 2021 it emerged that many of the studies demonstrating benefit were faulty, misleading, or fraudulent. Nevertheless, misinformation about ivermectin continued to be propagated on social media and the drug remained a cause célèbre for anti-vaccinationists and conspiracy theorists. This spread to conspiracy theorists further asserting that ivermectin could treat all diseases.

== Antivirals ==
Research is focused on repurposing approved antiviral drugs that have been previously developed against other viruses, such as MERS-CoV, SARS-CoV, and West Nile virus. These include favipiravir, remdesivir, ribavirin, triazavirin, and umifenovir.

The combination of artesunate/pyronaridine was found to have an inhibitory effect on SARS-CoV-2 in vitro tests using Hela cells. Artesunate/pyronaridine showed a virus titer inhibition rate of 99% or more after 24 hours, while cytotoxicity was also reduced. A preprint published in July 2020, reported that pyronaridine and artesunate exhibit antiviral activity against SARS-CoV-2 and influenza viruses using human lung epithelial (Calu-3) cells. It is in phase II clinical trial in South Korea and in South Africa.

Molnupiravir is a drug developed to treat influenza. It is in Phase III trials as a treatment for COVID-19. In December 2020, scientists reported that the antiviral drug molnupiravir developed for the treatment of influenza can completely suppress SARS-CoV-2 transmission within 24 hours in ferrets whose COVID-19 transmission they find to closely resemble SARS-CoV-2 spread in human young-adult populations. A clinical trial, which has not as of 1 October 2021 been peer reviewed, suggests molnupiravir taken orally can reduce the risk of hospitalization and prevent death in patients diagnosed with COVID-19. The drug needs to be given early to be effective. As of 1 January 2022, Molnupiravir has been approved for emergency use against COVID-19 in the United Kingdom, India, and the United States.

Niclosamide was identified as a candidate antiviral in an in vitro drug screening assay done in South Korea.

Protease inhibitors, which specifically target the protease 3CLpro, are being researched and developed in the laboratory such as CLpro-1, GC376, and Rupintrivir.

Coronaviruses species possess an intrinsic resistance to ribavirin.

Sofosbuvir/daclatasvir is a drug combination developed to treat hepatitis C. In October 2020, a meta-analysis found a significantly lower risk of all-cause mortality with the drug combination when given to hospitalized patients.

=== Favipiravir ===
Favipiravir is an antiviral drug approved for the treatment of influenza in Japan. There is limited evidence suggesting that, compared to other antiviral drugs, favipiravir might improve outcomes for people with COVID-19, but more rigorous studies are needed before any conclusions can be drawn.

Chinese clinical trials in Wuhan and Shenzhen claimed to show that favipiravir was "clearly effective". Of 35 patients in Shenzhen tested negative in a median of 4 days, while the length of illness was 11 days in the 45 patients who did not receive it. In a study conducted in Wuhan on 240 patients with pneumonia half were given favipiravir and half received umifenovir. The researchers found that patients recovered from coughs and fevers faster when treated with favipiravir, but that there was no change in how many patients in each group progressed to more advanced stages of illness that required treatment with a ventilator.

On 22 March 2020, Italy approved the drug for experimental use against COVID-19 and began conducting trials in the three regions most affected by the disease. The Italian Pharmaceutical Agency reminded the public that the existing evidence in support of the drug is scant and preliminary.

On 30 May 2020, the Russian Health Ministry approved a generic version of favipiravir named Avifavir, which proved highly effective in the first phase of clinical trials.

In June 2020, India approved the use of a generic version of favipiravir called FabiFlu, developed by Glenmark Pharmaceuticals, in the treatment of mild to moderate cases of COVID-19.

On 26 May 2021, a systematic review found a 24% greater chance of clinical improvement when administered in the first seven days of hospitalization, but no statistically significant reduction in mortality for any of the groups, including hospitalized patients and those with mild or moderate symptoms.

=== Lopinavir/ritonavir ===
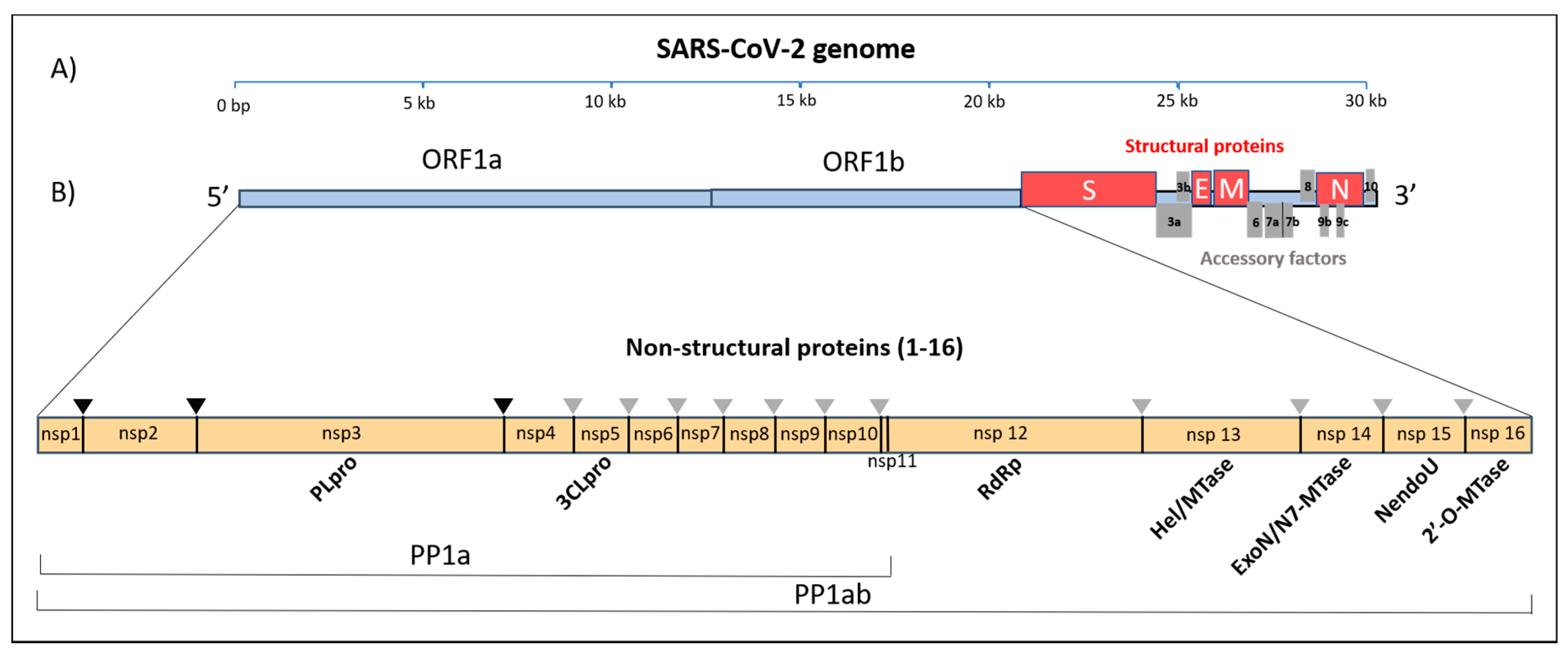
Genome of SARS-CoV-2: the grey wedges show where 3CLpro the main coronavirus protease cleaves the polyprotein.

In March 2020, the main protease (3CLpro) of the SARS-CoV-2 virus was identified as a target for post-infection drugs. The enzyme is essential for processing the replication-related polyprotein. To find the enzyme, scientists used the genome published by Chinese researchers in January 2020 to isolate the main protease. Protease inhibitors approved for treating human immunodeficiency viruses (HIV) – lopinavir and ritonavir – have preliminary evidence of activity against the coronaviruses, SARS and MERS. As a potential combination therapy, they are used together in two Phase III arms of the 2020 global Solidarity project on COVID-19. A preliminary study in China of combined lopinavir and ritonavir found no effect in people hospitalized for COVID-19.

One study of lopinavir/ritonavir (Kaletra), a combination of the antivirals lopinavir and ritonavir, concluded that "no benefit was observed". The drugs were designed to inhibit HIV from replicating by binding to the protease. A team of researchers at the University of Colorado are trying to modify the drugs to find a compound that will bind with the protease of SARS-CoV-2. There are criticisms within the scientific community about directing resources to repurposing drugs specifically developed for HIV/AIDS because such drugs are unlikely to be effective against a virus lacking the specific HIV-1 protease they target. The WHO included lopinavir/ritonavir in the international Solidarity trial.

On 29 June, the chief investigators of the UK RECOVERY Trial reported that there was no clinical benefit from use of lopinavir-ritonavir in 1,596 people hospitalized with severe COVID-19 infection over 28 days of treatment.

A study published in October 2020, screening those drugs approved by the US Food and Drug Administration (FDA) which target SARS-CoV-2 spike (S) protein proposed that the current unbalanced combination formula of lopinavir might in fact interfere with the ritonavir's blocking activity on the receptor binding domain-human angiotensin converting enzyme-2 (RBD-hACE2) interaction, thus effectively limiting its therapeutic benefit in COVID-19 cases.

In 2022, the PANORAMIC trial is testing the effectiveness of nirmatrelvir combined with ritonavir, and molnupiravir in preventing hospitalization and helping faster recovery for people aged over 50 and those at higher risk due to underlying health conditions. As of March 2022 has over 16,000 people enrolled as participants making it the largest study into COVID-19 antivirals.

=== Remdesivir ===
Remdesivir, sold under the brand name Veklury, is a broad-spectrum antiviral medication developed by the biopharmaceutical company Gilead Sciences. It is administered via injection into a vein. During the COVID‑19 pandemic, remdesivir was approved or authorized for emergency use to treat COVID‑19 in numerous countries.

Remdesivir was originally developed to treat hepatitis C, and was subsequently investigated for Ebola virus disease and Marburg virus infections before being studied as a post-infection treatment for COVID‑19.

Remdesivir is a prodrug that is intended to allow intracellular delivery of GS-441524 monophosphate and subsequent biotransformation into GS-441524 triphosphate, a ribonucleotide analogue inhibitor of viral RNA polymerase.

The most common side effect in healthy volunteers is raised blood levels of liver enzymes. The most common side effect in people with COVID‑19 is nausea. Side effects may include liver inflammation and an infusion-related reaction with nausea, low blood pressure, and sweating.

The US Food and Drug Administration (FDA) considers it to be a first-in-class medication.

== Immunomodulatory treatments ==
=== Baricitinib ===
In May 2022, the US Food and Drug Administration (FDA) approved baricitinib for the treatment of COVID-19 in hospitalized adults requiring supplemental oxygen, non-invasive or invasive mechanical ventilation, or extracorporeal membrane oxygenation (ECMO). Barictinib is the first immunomodulatory treatment for COVID-19 to receive FDA approval.

In the United States, baricitinib is authorized under an emergency use authorization (EUA) for the treatment of COVID-19 in hospitalized people aged 2 to less than 18 years of age who require supplemental oxygen, non-invasive or invasive mechanical ventilation, or extracorporeal membrane oxygenation.

== Immunosuppressants ==
=== Anakinra ===
In December 2021, anakinra (Kineret) was authorized in the European Union for the treatment of COVID-19 in adults with pneumonia requiring supplemental oxygen (low or high flow oxygen) and who are at risk of developing severe respiratory failure, as determined by blood levels of a protein called suPAR (soluble urokinase plasminogen activator receptor) of at least 6 ng per ml."

== Interferons ==
Drugs with immune modulating effects that may prove useful in COVID-19 treatment include type I Interferons such as Interferon-β, peginterferon alpha-2a and -2b.

IFN-β 1b have been shown in an open label randomised controlled trial in combination with lopinavir/ ritonavir and ribavirin to significantly reduce viral load, alleviate symptoms and reduce cytokine responses when compared to lopinavir/ ritonavir alone. IFN-β will be included in the international Solidarity Trial in combination with the HIV drugs Lopinavir and Ritonavir. as well as the REMAP-CAP Finnish biotech firm Faron Pharmaceuticals continues to develop INF-beta for ARDS and is involved in worldwide initiatives against COVID-19, including the Solidarity trial. UK biotech firm Synairgen started conducting trials on IFN-β, a drug that was originally developed to treat COPD.

== Steroids ==
Systemic corticosteroids have a small but statistically significant beneficial effect in reducing 30-day all-cause mortality in individuals hospitalized with COVID-19.

=== Budesonide ===
Administration of this inhaled steroid early in the course of COVID-19 infection has been found to reduce the likelihood of needing urgent medical care and reduced the time to recovery. More studies are on-going. In April 2021, budesonide was approved by authorities in the UK for off-label use to treat COVID-19 on a case-by-case basis.

=== Ciclesonide ===
Ciclesonide, an inhaled corticosteroid for asthma, was identified as a candidate antiviral in an in vitro drug screening assay done in South Korea. It has been used for treatment of pre-symptomatic COVID-19 patients and is undergoing clinical trials.

=== Dexamethasone ===
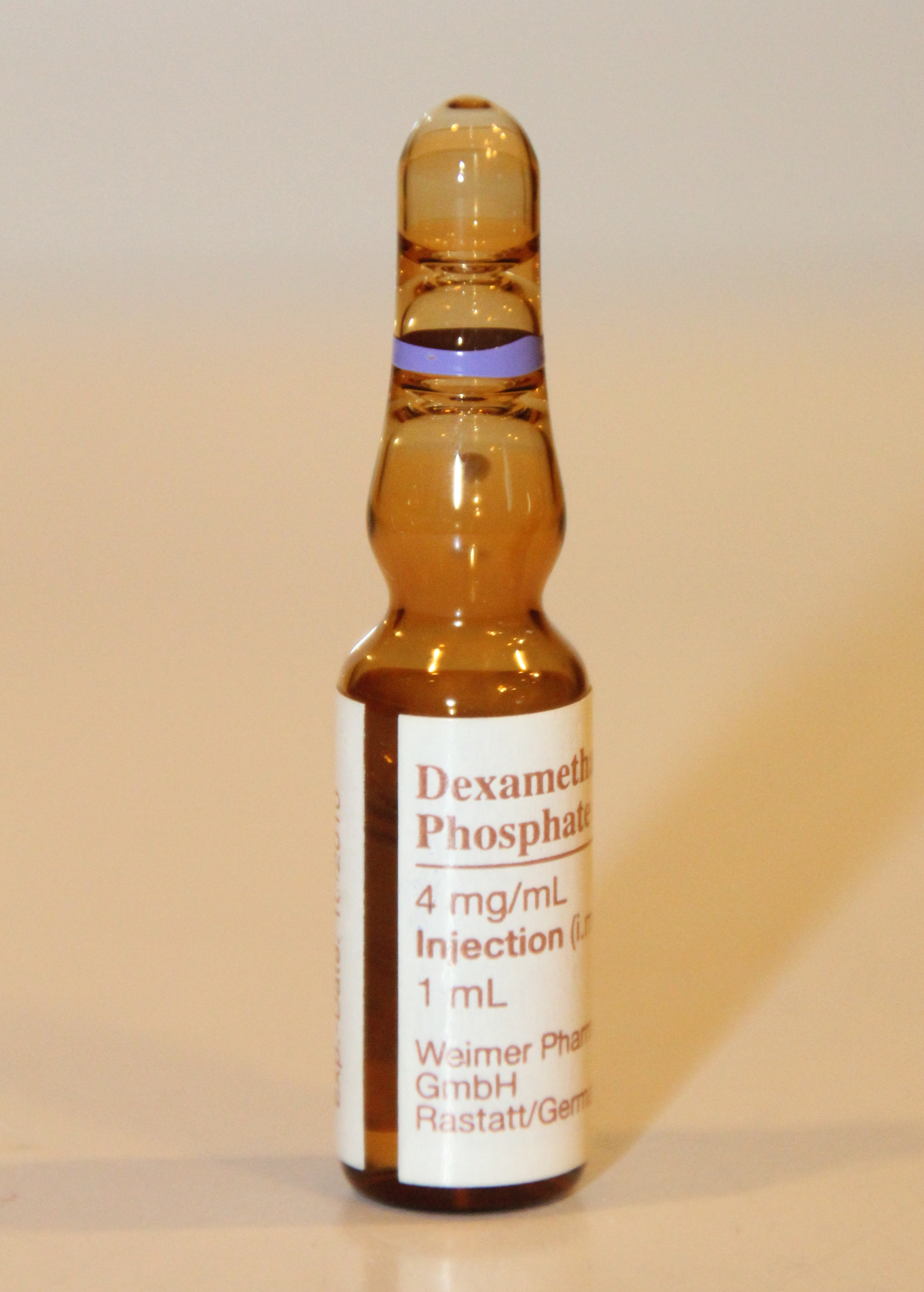
A vial of dexamethasone for injection

Dexamethasone is a corticosteroid medication in use for multiple conditions such as rheumatic problems, skin diseases, asthma and chronic obstructive lung disease among others. A multi-center, randomized controlled trial of dexamethasone in treating acute respiratory distress syndrome (ARDS), published in February 2020, showed reduced need for mechanical ventilation and mortality. Dexamethasone is only helpful in people requiring supplemental oxygen. Following an analysis of seven randomized trials, the WHO recommends the use of systemic corticosteroids in guidelines for treatment of people with severe or critical illness, and that they not be used in people that do not meet the criteria for severe illness.

On 16 June, the Oxford University RECOVERY Trial issued a press release announcing preliminary results that the drug could reduce deaths by about a third in participants on ventilators and by about a fifth in participants on oxygen; it did not benefit patients who did not require respiratory support. The researchers estimated that treating 8 patients on ventilators with dexamethasone saved one life, and treating 25 patients on oxygen saved one life. Several experts called for the full dataset to be published quickly to allow wider analysis of the results. A preprint was published on 22 June and the peer-reviewed article appeared on 17 July.

Based on those preliminary results, dexamethasone treatment has been recommended by the US National Institutes of Health (NIH) for patients with COVID-19 who are mechanically ventilated or who require supplemental oxygen but are not mechanically ventilated. The NIH recommends against using dexamethasone in patients with COVID-19 who do not require supplemental oxygen. In July 2020, the World Health Organization (WHO) stated they are in the process of updating treatment guidelines to include dexamethasone or other steroids.

The Infectious Diseases Society of America (IDSA) guideline panel suggests the use of glucocorticoids for patients with severe COVID-19; where severe is defined as patients with oxygen saturation (SpO_{2}) ≤94% on room air, and those who require supplemental oxygen, mechanical ventilation, or extracorporeal membrane oxygenation (ECMO). The IDSA recommends against the use of glucocorticoids for those with COVID-19 without hypoxemia requiring supplemental oxygen.

In July 2020, the European Medicines Agency (EMA) started reviewing results from the RECOVERY study arm that involved the use of dexamethasone in the treatment of patients with COVID-19 admitted to the hospital to provide an opinion on the results. It focused particularly on the potential use of the drug for the treatment of adults with COVID-19.

In September 2020, the WHO released updated guidance on using corticosteroids for COVID-19. The WHO recommends systemic corticosteroids rather than no systemic corticosteroids for the treatment of people with severe and critical COVID-19 (strong recommendation, based on moderate certainty evidence). The WHO suggests not to use corticosteroids in the treatment of people with non-severe COVID-19 (conditional recommendation, based on low certainty evidence).

In September 2020, the European Medicines Agency (EMA) endorsed the use of dexamethasone in adults and adolescents (from twelve years of age and weighing at least 40 kilograms (88 lb)) who require supplemental oxygen therapy. Dexamethasone can be taken by mouth or given as an injection or infusion (drip) into a vein.

=== Hydrocortisone ===
In September 2020, a meta-analysis published by the WHO Rapid Evidence Appraisal for COVID-19 Therapies (REACT) Working Group found hydrocortisone to be effective in reducing mortality rate of critically ill COVID-19 patients when compared to other usual care or a placebo.

The use of corticosteroids can cause a severe and deadly "hyperinfection" syndrome for people with strongyloidiasis, which may be an underlying condition in populations exposed to the parasite Strongyloides stercoralis. This risk can be mitigated by the presumptive use of ivermectin before steroid treatment.

=== Methylprednisolone ===
In March–April 2020, a small bioinformatics company, AdvaitaBio, used its data analysis platform, iPathwayGuide, to analyze one of the first transcriptomics data sets that became available from COVID-19 patients. This analysis was able to identify methylprednisolone as a drug that could potentially help patients with severe cases of this disease. The analysis of the molecular data indicated that patients with severe COVID-19 suffered from the cytokine storm syndrome, and also identified the specific pathways and mechanisms through which methylprednisolone would help revert many of the important gene expression changes induced by the cytokine storm. A subsequent clinical trial undertaken in the Henry Ford Health Systems showed that methylprednisolone reduced mortality by approximately 44% (from 29.6% to 16.6%). The results contradicted flagrantly the recommendations of the World Health Organization, which at the time, had a standing recommendation NOT to use systemic steroids in COVID-19 patients. This, together with the very tense scientific environment cause by theretraction of some early COVID-19-related papers, delayed the publication of these results by several months. This was very unfortunate, since methylprednisolone is low-cost and widely available and could have prevented many thousands of deaths. Several months later, the results of the RECOVERY trial (see dexamethasone above) also showed steroids as being effective in reducing mortality, and helped change the general opinion about steroid treatments in COVID-19. The drug repurposing analysis that was first to propose a steroid for severe COVID-19 case was eventually published in the journal Bioinformatics Currently, steroids including methylprednisolone and dexamethasone are part of the standard of care in severe cases of COVID-19.

For a composite end point of preventing ICU admission, need for mechanical ventilator or mortality, the number needed to treat (NNT) to benefit a single patient was only 5 for methylprednisolone when used early in hospitalization. The NNT necessary for methylprednisolone to avoid a death was only 8 for all hospitalized patients. This is in contrast to the RECOVERY trial (NCT04323592) for dexamethasone (see Dexamethasone above), where NNT was 8 for patients on mechanical ventilation, and 25 for patients needed oxygen to prevent mortality.

== Vitamins ==
=== Vitamin C ===
Supplementation with vitamin C, has been suggested as part of the supportive management of COVID-19, as serum levels of the vitamin are depleted in the acute stage of infection owing to increased metabolic demands. In April 2021, the US National Institutes of Health (NIH) COVID-19 Treatment Guidelines stated that "there are insufficient data to recommend either for or against the use of vitamin C for the prevention or treatment of COVID-19." In an update posted December 2022, the NIH position was unchanged:

- There is insufficient evidence for the COVID-19 Treatment Guidelines Panel (the Panel) to recommend either for or against the use of vitamin C for the treatment of COVID-19 in nonhospitalized patients.
- There is insufficient evidence for the Panel to recommend either for or against the use of vitamin C for the treatment of COVID-19 in hospitalized patients.

Three meta-analyses of people hospitalized with severe COVID-19 - with a high overlap in the clinical trials being included - reported a significant reduction in the risk of all-cause, in-hospital mortality with the administration of vitamin C relative to no vitamin C. There were no significant differences in ventilation incidence, hospitalization duration or length of intensive care unit stay between the two groups. The majority of the trials used intravenous administration of the vitamin. Acute kidney injury was lower in people treated with vitamin C treatment. There were no differences in the frequency of other adverse events due to the vitamin. All three journal articles concluded that further large-scale studies are needed to affirm its mortality benefits before issuing updated guidelines and recommendations.

=== Vitamin D ===
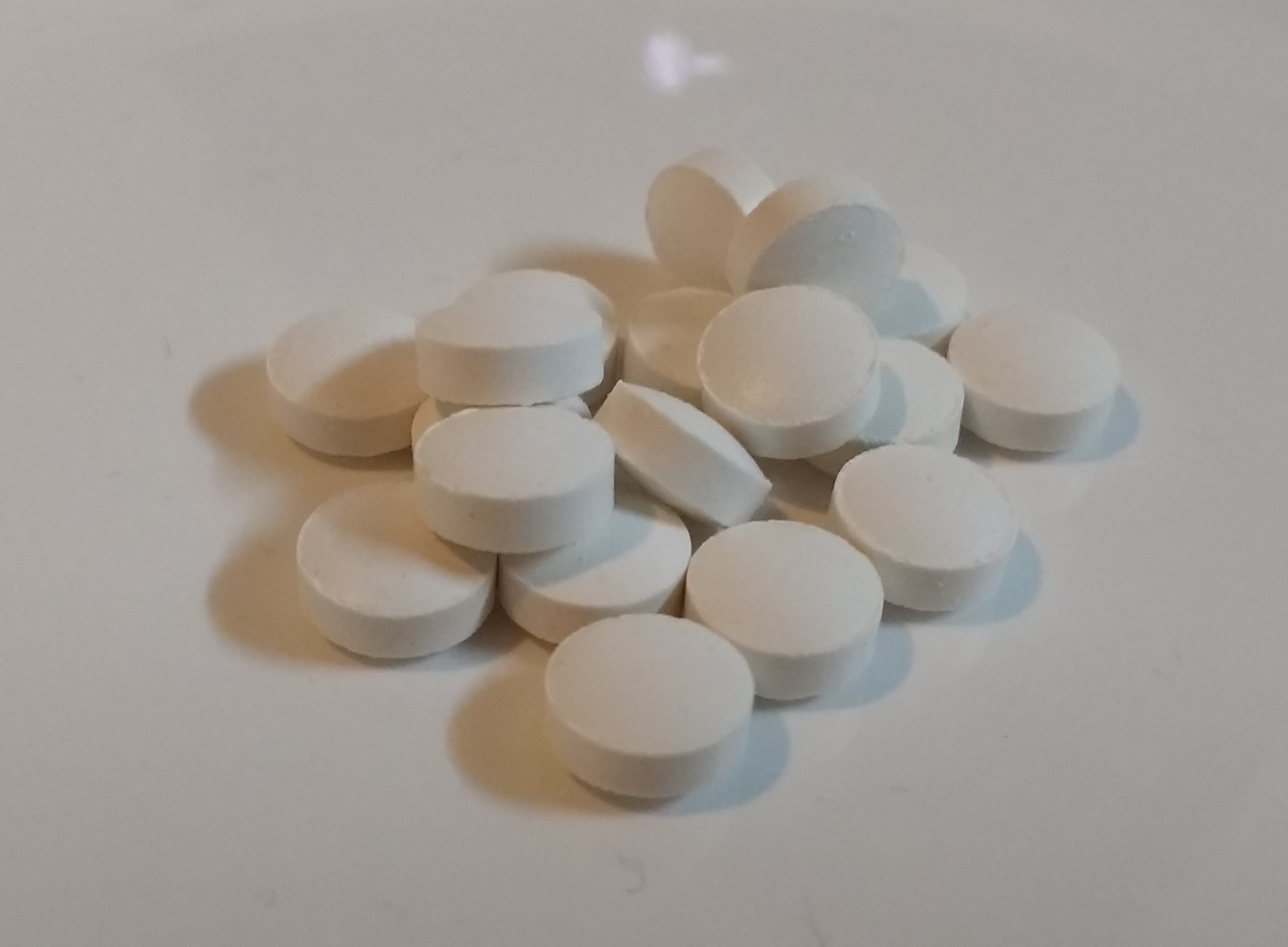
Oral vitamin D tablets

During the COVID-19 pandemic, there has been interest in vitamin D status and supplements, given the significant overlap in the risk factors for severe COVID-19 and vitamin D deficiency. These include obesity, older age, and Black or Asian ethnic origin, and it is notable that vitamin D deficiency is particularly common within these groups.

The National Institutes of Health (NIH) COVID-19 Treatment Guidelines states "there is insufficient evidence to recommend either for or against the use of vitamin D for the prevention or treatment of COVID-19."

The general recommendation to consider taking vitamin D supplements, particularly given the levels of vitamin D deficiency in Western populations, has been repeated. As of February 2021, the English National Institute for Health and Care Excellence (NICE) continued to recommend small doses of supplementary vitamin D for people with little exposure to sunshine, but recommended that practitioners should not offer a vitamin D supplement solely to prevent or treat COVID-19, except as part of a clinical trial.

Multiple studies have reported links between pre-existing vitamin D deficiency and the severity of the disease. Several systematic reviews and meta-analyses of these show that vitamin D deficiency may be associated with a higher probability of becoming infected with COVID-19, and have clearly demonstrated there are significant associations between deficiency and a greater severity of the disease, including relative increases in hospitalization and mortality rates of about 80%. The quality of some of the studies included and whether this demonstrates a causal relationship has been questioned.

Many clinical trials are underway or have been completed assessing the use of oral vitamin D and its metabolites such as calcifediol for prevention or treatment of COVID-19 infection, especially in people with vitamin D deficiency.

The effects of oral vitamin D supplementation on the need for intensive care unit (ICU) admission and mortality in hospitalized people with COVID-19 has been the subject of a meta-analysis. A much lower ICU admission rate was found in patients who received vitamin D supplementation, which was only 36% of that seen in patients without supplementation (p<0.0001). No significant effects on mortality were found in this meta-analysis. The certainty of these analyses is limited by the heterogenicity in the studies which include both vitamin D3 (cholecalciferol) and calcifediol, but these findings indicate a potential role in improving COVID-19 severity, with more robust data being required to substantiate any effects on mortality.

Calcifediol, which is 25-hydroxyvitamin D, is more quickly activated, and has been used in several trials. Review of the published results suggests that calcifediol supplementation may have a protective effect on the risk of ICU admissions in people with COVID-19.

== Minerals ==
=== Zinc ===
The National Institutes of Health (NIH) COVID-19 Treatment Guidelines states "there is insufficient evidence to recommend either for or against the use of zinc for the treatment of COVID-19" and that "the Panel recommends against using zinc supplementation above the recommended dietary allowance for the prevention of COVID-19, except in a clinical trial (BIII)."

== Others ==
- Antibiotics: Some antibiotics that have been identified as potentially repurposable as COVID-19 treatments, including:
  - Broad-spectrum therapeutics: In 2021, the importance of drug repurposing for COVID-19 led to the establishment of broad-spectrum therapeutics. Broad-spectrum therapeutics are effective against multiple types of pathogens. Such drugs have been suggested as potential emergency treatments for future pandemics.
  - Teicoplanin,
  - Oritavancin,
  - Dalbavancin,
  - Monensin,
  - Azithromycin.
- Bucillamine: On 31 July 2020, the U.S. Food and Drug Administration (FDA) authorized Revive Therapeutics to proceed with a randomized, double-blind, placebo-controlled confirmatory Phase III clinical trial protocol to evaluate the safety and efficacy of the antirheumatic agent bucillamine in patients with mild-moderate COVID-19.
- Clofoctol, a bacteriostatic antibiotic, has been proposed as a treatment for COVID-19. A study in mice showed that clofoctol blocks the replication of SARS-CoV-2.
- Colchicine: Researchers from the Montreal Heart Institute in Canada are studying the role of colchicine in reducing inflammation and pulmonary complications in patients with mild symptoms of COVID-19. The study, named COLCORONA, was recruiting 6000 adults 40 and older who were diagnosed with COVID-19 and experienced mild symptoms not requiring hospitalization. Women who were pregnant or breastfeeding or who did not have an effective contraceptive method were not eligible. The trial results are favorable, but inconclusive.
- Fenofibrate and bezafibrate have been suggested for treatment of life-threatening symptoms of COVID-19. Fenofibrate also lowered severe progressive inflammation markers in hospitalized COVID-19 patients within 48 hours of treatment in an Israeli study. It showed extremely promising results by interfering with how coronavirus reproduce.
- nanoFenretinide is nanoparticle sized fenretinide and repurposed oncology drug approved to enter the clinic for a lymphoma indication. It was identified as a candidate antiviral in an in vitro drug screening assay done in South Korea.
- Histamine H_{2} receptor antagonists are under investigation.
  - Cimetidine has been suggested as a treatment for COVID-19.
  - Famotidine has been suggested as a treatment for COVID-19, and a clinical study is underway.
- Ibuprofen: A trial called "Liberate" has been started in the United Kingdom to determine the effectiveness of ibuprofen in reducing the severity and progression of lung injury which results in breathing difficulties for COVID-19 patients. Subjects are to receive three doses of a special formulation of the drug – lipid ibuprofen – in addition to usual care.
- Influenza vaccine: A clinical cohort study in Brazil found that COVID-19 patients who received a recent influenza vaccine needed less intensive care support, less invasive respiratory support, and were less likely to die.
- Sildenafil, more commonly known by the brand name Viagra, is proposed as a treatment for COVID-19, and a Phase III clinical trial is underway.

== Found ineffective ==
The use of aspirin, hydroxychloroquine, azithromycin, and colchicine were found ineffective against COVID-19. The use of the combination of lopinavir and ritonavir together was found ineffective against COVID-19. The use of the combination of etesevimab and bamlanivimab together was found ineffective against the Omicron variant.
