= Lufotrelvir =

Chemical compound

Legal status
- Legal status: US: Investigational drug

Identifiers
- IUPAC name: [(3S)-3-[(2S)-2-[(4-methoxy-1H-indol-2-yl)formamido]-4-methylpentanamido]-2-oxo-4-[(3S)-2-oxopyrrolidin-3-yl]butoxy]phosphonic acid
- CAS Number: 2468015-78-1
- PubChem CID: 154699467
- IUPHAR/BPS: 11249
- DrugBank: DB16514
- ChemSpider: 114935506
- UNII: XJ51YOB1SC
- KEGG: D12172
- ChEBI: CHEBI:173073
- ChEMBL: ChEMBL4802214
- CompTox Dashboard (EPA): DTXSID501337108

Chemical and physical data
- Formula: C_{24}H_{33}N_{4}O_{9}P
- Molar mass: 552.521 g·mol^{−1}
- 3D model (JSmol): Interactive image
- SMILES: CC(C)C[C@@H](C(=O)N[C@@H](C[C@@H]1CCNC1=O)C(=O)COP(=O)(O)O)NC(=O)C2=CC3=C(N2)C=CC=C3OC
- InChI: InChI=1S/C24H33N4O9P/c1-13(2)9-18(28-24(32)19-11-15-16(26-19)5-4-6-21(15)36-3)23(31)27-17(10-14-7-8-25-22(14)30)20(29)12-37-38(33,34)35/h4-6,11,13-14,17-18,26H,7-10,12H2,1-3H3,(H,25,30)(H,27,31)(H,28,32)(H2,33,34,35)/t14-,17-,18-/m0/s1; Key:FQKALOFOWPDTED-WBAXXEDZSA-N

Lufotrelvir (PF-07304814) is an antiviral drug developed by Pfizer which acts as a 3CL protease inhibitor. It is a prodrug with the phosphate group being cleaved in vivo to yield the active agent PF-00835231. Lufotrelvir is in human clinical trials for the treatment of COVID-19, and shows good activity against COVID-19 including several variant strains, but unlike the related drug nirmatrelvir it is not orally active and must be administered by intravenous infusion, and so has been the less favoured candidate for clinical development overall.

== See also ==
- 3CLpro-1
- Bemnifosbuvir
- Baloxavir marboxil
- Favipiravir
- GC376
- GRL-0617
- Molnupiravir
- Remdesivir
- Ribavirin
- Rupintrivir
- S-217622
- Triazavirin
