= CYP3A =

Human gene

Cytochrome P450
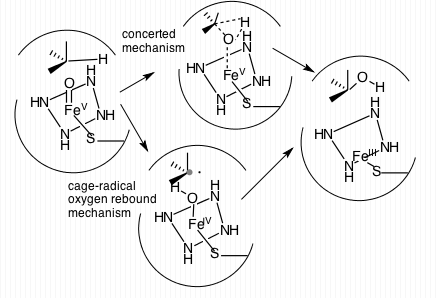
- Mechanism of CYP450 enzymatic catalysis

Identifiers
- Symbol: p450
- Pfam: PF00067
- InterPro: IPR001128
- PROSITE: PDOC00081
- SCOP2: 2cpp / SCOPe / SUPFAM
- OPM superfamily: 39
- OPM protein: 2bdm
- CDD: cd00302
- Membranome: 265
Available protein structures:
- PDB: IPR001128 PF00067 (ECOD; PDBsum)
- AlphaFold: IPR001128; PF00067

Cytochrome P450, family 3, subfamily A, also known as CYP3A, is a human gene locus. A homologous locus is found in mice. These genes encode monooxygenases which catalyze many reactions involved in the synthesis of cholesterol, steroids and other lipids as well as drug metabolism.

The CYP3A locus includes all the known members of the 3A subfamily of the cytochrome P450 superfamily of genes. The CYP3A cluster consists of four genes:

- CYP3A4,
- CYP3A5,
- CYP3A7, and
- CYP3A43.

The region also contains four pseudogenes:

- CYP3A51P,
- CYP3A52P,
- CYP3A54P, and
- CYP3A137P.

as well as several extra exons which may or may not be included in transcripts produced from this region. Previously another CYP3A member, CYP3A3, was thought to exist; however, it is now thought that this sequence represents a transcript variant of CYP3A4.

== Structure ==
Structurally, the key to the CYP3A enzyme's large range of activity is the heme cofactor and the P450 protein fold, an oxidation reaction through molecular oxygen and NADPH. The enzyme binds to the substrate, where electrons are accepted from NADPH, and a reactive iron-oxo species inserts an oxygen atom into the substrate, making the metabolized drug more polar. The active site is large and flexible allowing it to bind to a wide variety of substrates, and this specifically occurs due to secondary structure elements like helices and loops that can accommodate bulky ligands. Another important feature of the active site is its ability to accommodate multiple substrates at once leading to cooperative interactions, making the CYP3A family often more potent than other types of CYP450 isoforms.

== Function ==
=== Endogenous substrate catabolism ===
The CYP3A subfamily of enzymes is integral to the metabolism of a variety of endogenous compounds, thereby contributing to the maintenance of physiological homeostasis. These enzymes, including CYP3A4, CYP3A5, and CYP3A7, are involved in the catabolism of steroid hormones, metabolism of bile acids, cholesterol, arachidonic acid, vitamin D, and other lipids. For example, CYP3A4 catalyzes the conversion of arachidonic acid into epoxyeicosatrienoic acids (EETs), which have roles in blood pressure regulation, anti-inflammatory responses, and cell proliferation. CYP3A enzymes also participate in the termination of steroid hormone action and the detoxification of bile acids, highlighting their significance in hormonal regulation and metabolic balance. Variations in CYP3A expression, influenced by genetic and physiological factors, can alter the metabolism of these endogenous substrates, potentially impacting disease susceptibility and progression.

=== Xenobiotic metabolism ===
The CYP3A subfamily is critically involved in the detoxification and biotransformation of xenobiotics, including a wide array of clinically used drugs, environmental chemicals, toxins, and dietary compounds. Among the isoforms, CYP3A4 is the most abundant in the adult human liver and intestine and is responsible for metabolizing approximately 30–50% of all prescription drugs, including acetaminophen, codeine, cyclosporine, diazepam, and erythromycin. These enzymes catalyze oxidative reactions that enhance the water solubility of lipophilic substances, thereby facilitating their elimination from the body.

CYP3A-mediated metabolism can lead to either drug inactivation or bioactivation, resulting in pharmacologically active or potentially toxic metabolites. Expression and activity levels of CYP3A enzymes vary significantly among individuals due to genetic polymorphisms and environmental factors, which can influence drug efficacy, safety, and the likelihood of adverse drug interactions.

The CYP3A subfamily also plays a central role in phase I metabolism, introducing polar functional groups that increase water solubility and promote excretion from the body. These enzymes account for the oxidative metabolism of roughly 30% of all clinical drugs, including statins and chemotherapeutics.

Regulation of CYP3A enzymes plays a significant role in pharmacokinetics, particularly in the context of drug-drug interactions. Both inhibition and induction of these enzymes can substantially alter drug metabolism. For example, Paxlovid combines Nirmatrelvir, a Mpro-protease inhibitor, with Ritonavir, a potent CYP3A inhibitor that slows the breakdown of Nirmatrelvir, enhancing its therapeutic effect.
