= Ibuzatrelvir =

Antiviral drug

Clinical data
- Other names: PF-07817883
- Routes of administration: Oral

Legal status
- Legal status: Investigational

Identifiers
- IUPAC name: Methyl N-[(2S)-1-[(2S,4R)-2-[[(1S)-1-cyano-2-[(3S)-2-oxopyrrolidin-3-yl]ethyl]carbamoyl]-4-(trifluoromethyl)pyrrolidin-1-yl]-3,3-dimethyl-1-oxobutan-2-yl]carbamate
- CAS Number: 2755812-39-4
- PubChem CID: 163362000
- DrugBank: 111
- ChemSpider: 128942571
- UNII: KZ2X7QH2VT

Chemical and physical data
- Formula: C_{21}H_{30}F_{3}N_{5}O_{5}
- Molar mass: 489.496 g·mol^{−1}
- 3D model (JSmol): Interactive image
- SMILES: CC(C)(C)[C@@H](C(=O)N1C[C@@H](C[C@H]1C(=O)N[C@@H](C[C@@H]2CCNC2=O)C#N)C(F)(F)F)NC(=O)OC
- InChI: InChI=1S/C21H30F3N5O5/c1-20(2,3)15(28-19(33)34-4)18(32)29-10-12(21(22,23)24)8-14(29)17(31)27-13(9-25)7-11-5-6-26-16(11)30/h11-15H,5-8,10H2,1-4H3,(H,26,30)(H,27,31)(H,28,33)/t11-,12+,13-,14-,15+/m0/s1; Key:WGNWEPPRWQKSKI-AIEDFZFUSA-N

Ibuzatrelvir (development code PF-07817883) is an experimental antiviral drug being developed by Pfizer for the treatment of COVID-19. It is a second-generation improvement over nirmatrelvir which has a similar chemical structure. One of the disadvantages of nirmatrelvir is that it has low metabolic stability and must be given in combination with ritonavir (as Paxlovid) to limit its metabolic degradation in the body. Ibuzatrelvir incorporates modifications to the chemical structure of nirmatrelvir that give it enhanced oral bioavailability, so it does not require coadministration with ritonavir.
