= GC376 =

Broad-spectrum antiviral medication

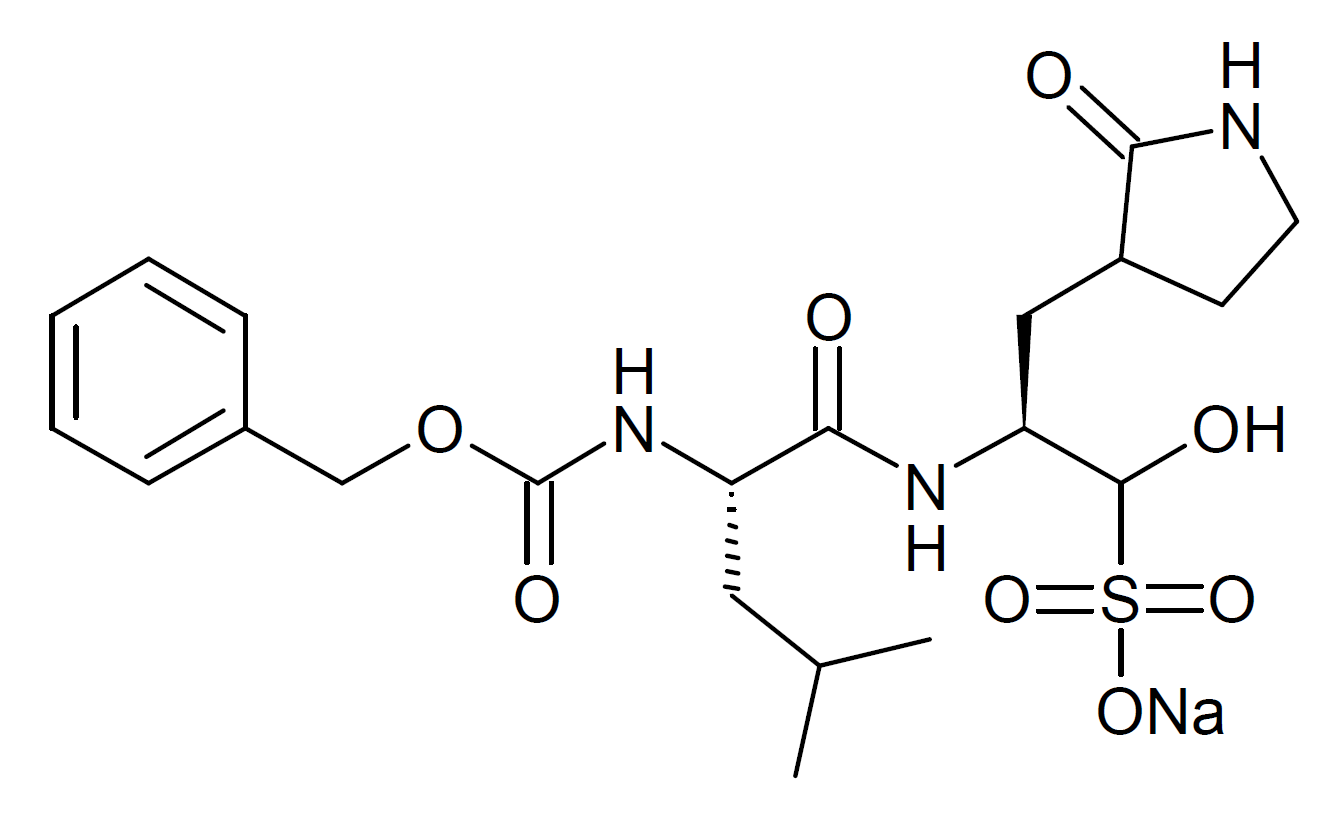

Legal status
- Legal status: US: Investigational drug

Identifiers
- IUPAC name: sodium (2S)-1-hydroxy-2-[[(2S)-4-methyl-2-(phenylmethoxycarbonylamino)pentanoyl]amino]-3-(2-oxopyrrolidin-3-yl)propane-1-sulfonate
- CAS Number: 1416992-39-6
- PubChem CID: 71481119
- ChemSpider: 29396096
- UNII: H1NMJ5XDG5
- ChEMBL: ChEMBL2315036

Chemical and physical data
- Formula: C_{21}H_{30}N_{3}NaO_{8}S
- Molar mass: 507.53 g·mol^{−1}
- 3D model (JSmol): Interactive image
- SMILES: CC(C)C[C@@H](C(=O)N[C@@H](CC1CCNC1=O)C(O)S(=O)(=O)[O-])NC(=O)OCC2=CC=CC=C2.[Na+]
- InChI: InChI=1S/C21H31N3O8S.Na/c1-13(2)10-16(24-21(28)32-12-14-6-4-3-5-7-14)19(26)23-17(20(27)33(29,30)31)11-15-8-9-22-18(15)25;/h3-7,13,15-17,20,27H,8-12H2,1-2H3,(H,22,25)(H,23,26)(H,24,28)(H,29,30,31);/q;+1/p-1/t15?,16-,17-,20?;/m0./s1; Key:BSPJDKCMFIPBAW-JPBGFCRCSA-M

GC376 is a broad-spectrum antiviral medication under development by the biopharmaceutical company Anivive Lifesciences for therapeutic uses in humans and animals. Anivive licensed the exclusive worldwide patent rights to GC376 from Kansas State University. As of 2020, GC376 is being investigated as a treatment for COVID-19. GC376 shows activity against many human and animal viruses, including coronavirus and norovirus; the most extensive research has been multiple in vivo studies in cats treating a coronavirus, which causes deadly feline infectious peritonitis. Other research supports use in porcine epidemic diarrhea virus.

== COVID-19 ==
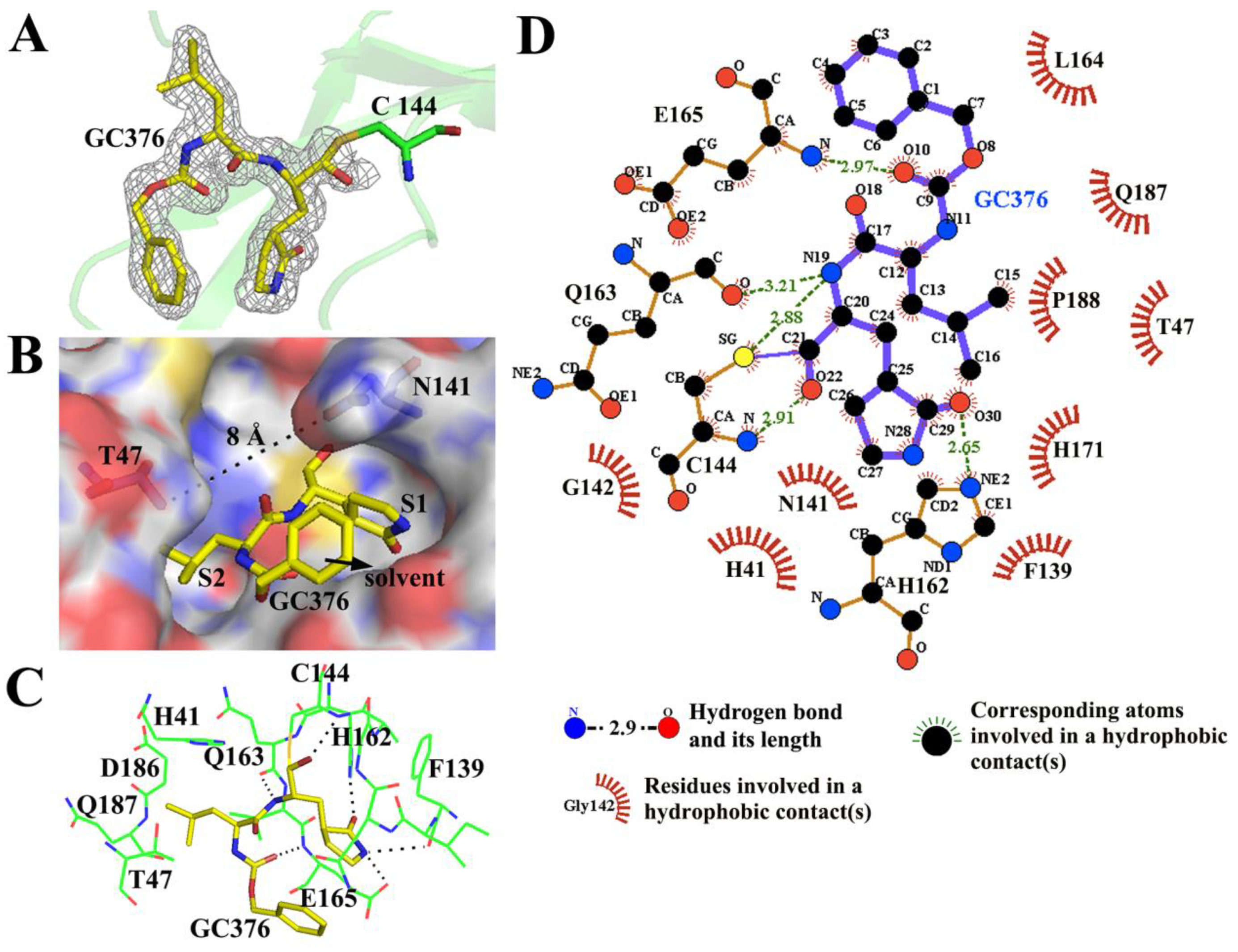
Crystal structure of the PEDV 3CLpro in complex with GC376.

Since GC376 shows broad-spectrum activity against coronavirus, early on during the pandemic of 2020, it was suggested as a potential treatment for COVID-19. In response to the crisis, researchers at the University of Arizona published in vitro research indicating GC376 is highly active against 3CLpro in SARS-CoV-2 (the coronavirus which causes COVID-19). Another group of virologists at the University of Alberta led by D. Lorne Tyrrell then released a separate publication confirming GC376's activity against 3CLpro in SARS-CoV-2 and also indicating GC376 had a potent antiviral effect.

== Pharmacology ==
=== Pharmacodynamics ===
GC376 is a protease inhibitor. It blocks 3CLpro, a protease common to many (+)ssRNA viruses, thereby preventing the viral polyprotein from maturing into its functional parts. Chemically, GC376 is the bisulfite adduct of the aldehyde GC373, and it behaves as a prodrug for that compound. This aldehyde forms a covalent bond with the cysteine-144 residue at the protease's active site, giving a monothioacetal and blocking the enzyme's normal function.

== See also ==
- 3CLpro-1
- Carmofur
- Ebselen
- GRL-0617
- Rupintrivir
- Theaflavin digallate
- Paxlovid
