= Iscartrelvir =

Chemical compound

Clinical data
- Other names: WPV01; WU-04

Identifiers
- IUPAC name: N-[(1S,2R)-2-[4-bromo-2-(methylcarbamoyl)-6-nitroanilino]cyclohexyl]isoquinoline-4-carboxamide
- CAS Number: 2921711-74-0
- PubChem CID: 156774920
- ChemSpider: 129307041
- UNII: W2LTV65R5E
- PDB ligand: J7R (PDBe, RCSB PDB)

Chemical and physical data
- Formula: C_{24}H_{24}BrN_{5}O_{4}
- Molar mass: 526.391 g·mol^{−1}
- 3D model (JSmol): Interactive image
- SMILES: CNC(=O)C1=C(C(=CC(=C1)Br)[N+](=O)[O-])N[C@@H]2CCCC[C@@H]2NC(=O)C3=CN=CC4=CC=CC=C43
- InChI: InChI=InChI=1S/C24H24BrN5O4/c1-26-23(31)17-10-15(25)11-21(30(33)34)22(17)28-19-8-4-5-9-20(19)29-24(32)18-13-27-12-14-6-2-3-7-16(14)18/h2-3,6-7,10-13,19-20,28H,4-5,8-9H2,1H3,(H,26,31)(H,29,32)/t19-,20+/m1/s1; Key:BPLNOSFMIIASSJ-UXHICEINSA-N

Iscartrelvir is an investigational new drug developed by the Westlake University for the treatment of COVID-19. It targets the SARS-CoV-2 3CL protease, which is crucial for the replication of the virus responsible for COVID-19.

== See also ==
- 3CLpro-1
- Rupintrivir
