= Bemnifosbuvir =

Chemical compound

Clinical data
- Other names: AT-527, AT-511

Legal status
- Legal status: US: Investigational New Drug

Identifiers
- IUPAC name: Propan-2-yl (2S)-2-[[[(2R,3R,4R,5R)-5-[2-amino-6-(methylamino)purin-9-yl]-4-fluoro-3-hydroxy-4-methyloxolan-2-yl]methoxy-phenoxyphosphoryl]amino]propanoate
- CAS Number: 1998705-64-8 2241337-84-6 (hemisulfate)
- PubChem CID: 122527455
- ChemSpider: 112747221
- UNII: 7UM3SQL968
- KEGG: D12255

Chemical and physical data
- Formula: C_{24}H_{33}FN_{7}O_{7}P
- Molar mass: 581.542 g·mol^{−1}
- 3D model (JSmol): Interactive image
- SMILES: C[C@@H](C(=O)OC(C)C)NP(=O)(OC[C@@H]1[C@H]([C@@]([C@@H](O1)N2C=NC3=C(N=C(N=C32)N)NC)(C)F)O)OC4=CC=CC=C4
- InChI: InChI=1S/C24H33FN7O7P/c1-13(2)37-21(34)14(3)31-40(35,39-15-9-7-6-8-10-15)36-11-16-18(33)24(4,25)22(38-16)32-12-28-17-19(27-5)29-23(26)30-20(17)32/h6-10,12-14,16,18,22,33H,11H2,1-5H3,(H,31,35)(H3,26,27,29,30)/t14-,16+,18+,22+,24+,40?/m0/s1; Key:OISLSHLAXHALQZ-HEOQURLSSA-N

Bemnifosbuvir (AT-527, RO7496998) is an antiviral drug invented by Atea Pharmaceuticals and licensed to Roche for clinical development, a novel nucleotide analog prodrug originally developed for the treatment of hepatitis C. Bemnifosbuvir is the orally bioavailable hemisulfate salt of AT-511, which is metabolized in several steps to the active nucleotide triphosphate AT-9010, acting as an RNA polymerase inhibitor and thereby interfering with viral replication. Bemnifosbuvir has been researched for the treatment of coronavirus diseases such as that produced by SARS-CoV-2. It showed good results in early clinical trials but had inconsistent results at later stages. Bemnifosbuvir's Phase III study ended early as it failed to meet its primary endpoint of symptom alleviation and did not decrease viral load. However, the drug was well-tolerated and reduced relative hospitalization risk by 71%.

== Drug repositioning ==
In a 2026 study, bemnifosbuvir and remdesivir were shown to effectively suppress tick-borne encephalitis virus replication across several in vitro and ex vivo models. However, bemnifosbuvir demonstrated superior tolerability compared with remdesivir.

== See also ==
- Galidesivir
- Lufotrelvir
- Molnupiravir
- Sofosbuvir
