= Broad-spectrum antiviral drug =

Class of antiviral drugs

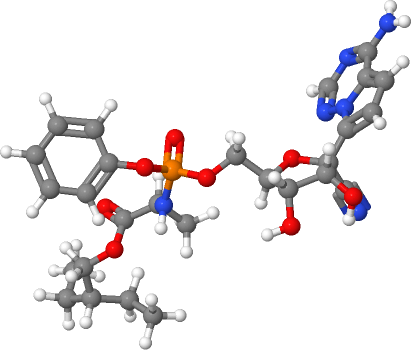
Remdesivir 3D structure

Broad-spectrum antivirals (BSAs) are a class of molecules or compounds, which inhibit the infection of multiple viruses from the same (intra-family BSAs) or different (inter-family BSAs) virus families. BSAs could be divided into experimental and investigational agents, and approved drugs. BSAs work by inhibiting viral proteins (such as polymerases and proteases) or by targeting host cell factors and processes exploited by different viruses during infection. As of 2021, there are 150 known BSAs in varying stages of development, effective against 78 human viruses. BSAs are potential candidates for treatment of emerging and re-emerging viruses, such as ebola, marburg, and SARS-CoV-2. Many BSAs show antiviral activity against other viruses than originally investigated (such as remdesivir and interferon alfa). Efforts in drug repurposing for SARS-CoV-2 is currently underway. A database of BSAs and viruses they inhibit could be found here (https://drugvirus.info/).

== See also ==
- Broad-spectrum antibiotic
- Broad-spectrum therapeutic
