= Rupintrivir =

Chemical compound

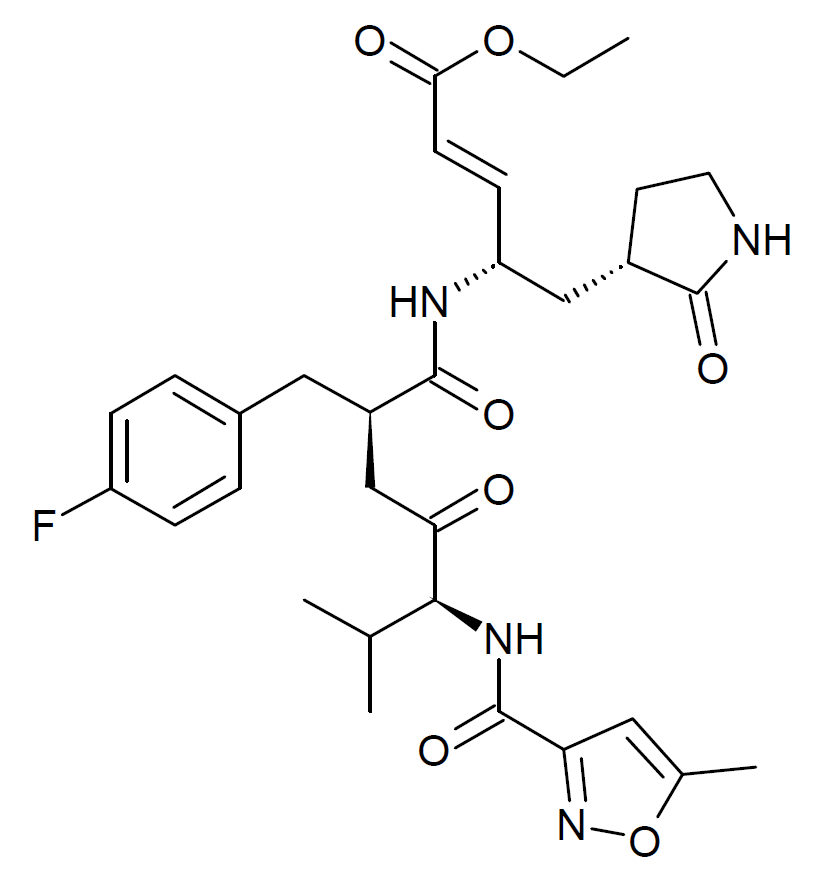

Clinical data
- Trade names: Rupintrivir

Legal status
- Legal status: US: Investigational drug

Identifiers
- IUPAC name: Ethyl (E,4S)-4-[[(2R,5S)-2-[(4-fluorophenyl)methyl]-6-methyl-5-[(5-methyl-1,2-oxazole-3-carbonyl)amino]-4-oxoheptanoyl]amino]-5-[(3S)-2-oxopyrrolidin-3-yl]pent-2-enoate
- CAS Number: 223537-30-2
- PubChem CID: 6440352
- DrugBank: 05102
- ChemSpider: 4944627
- UNII: RGE5K1Q5QW
- KEGG: D05776
- ChEMBL: ChEMBL20210

Chemical and physical data
- Formula: C_{31}H_{39}FN_{4}O_{7}
- Molar mass: 598.672 g·mol^{−1}
- 3D model (JSmol): Interactive image
- SMILES: CCOC(=O)/C=C/[C@H](C[C@@H]1CCNC1=O)NC(=O)[C@H](CC2=CC=C(C=C2)F)CC(=O)[C@H](C(C)C)NC(=O)C3=NOC(=C3)C
- InChI: InChI=1S/C31H39FN4O7/c1-5-42-27(38)11-10-24(16-21-12-13-33-29(21)39)34-30(40)22(15-20-6-8-23(32)9-7-20)17-26(37)28(18(2)3)35-31(41)25-14-19(4)43-36-25/h6-11,14,18,21-22,24,28H,5,12-13,15-17H2,1-4H3,(H,33,39)(H,34,40)(H,35,41)/b11-10+/t21-,22+,24+,28-/m0/s1; Key:CAYJBRBGZBCZKO-BHGBQCOSSA-N

Rupintrivir (AG-7088, Rupinavir) is a peptidomimetic antiviral drug which acts as a 3C and 3CL protease inhibitor. It was developed for the treatment of rhinoviruses, and has subsequently been investigated for the treatment of other viral diseases including those caused by picornaviruses, norovirus, and coronaviruses, such as SARS and COVID-19.

== See also ==
- 3CLpro-1
- Carmofur
- Ebselen
- GC376
- Iscartrelvir
- Theaflavin digallate
