= Nirmatrelvir =

COVID-19 antiviral medication

Clinical data
- Pronunciation: /nɜːrˈmætrəlvɪər/ nur-MAT-rəl-veer or /ˌnɜːrməˈtrɛlvɪər/ NUR-mə-TREL-veer
- Other names: PF-07321332
- License data: US DailyMed: Nirmatrelvir
- Pregnancy category: AU: B3
- Routes of administration: By mouth
- ATC code: None

Legal status
- Legal status: CA: ℞-only

Identifiers
- IUPAC name: (1R,2S,5S)-N-[(1S)-1-cyano-2-[(3S)-2-oxopyrrolidin-3-yl]ethyl]-3-[(2S)-3,3-dimethyl-2-[(2,2,2-trifluoroacetyl)amino]butanoyl]-6,6-dimethyl-3-azabicyclo[3.1.0]hexane-2-carboxamide
- CAS Number: 2628280-40-8
- PubChem CID: 155903259
- DrugBank: DB16691
- ChemSpider: 114826566
- UNII: 7R9A5P7H32
- KEGG: D12244
- ChEBI: CHEBI:170007
- CompTox Dashboard (EPA): DTXSID501336829
- ECHA InfoCard: 100.355.210

Chemical and physical data
- Formula: C_{23}H_{32}F_{3}N_{5}O_{4}
- Molar mass: 499.535 g·mol^{−1}
- 3D model (JSmol): Interactive image
- Melting point: 192.9 °C (379.2 °F)
- SMILES: CC1([C@@H]2[C@H]1[C@H](N(C2)C(=O)[C@H](C(C)(C)C)NC(=O)C(F)(F)F)C(=O)N[C@@H](C[C@@H]3CCNC3=O)C#N)C
- InChI: InChI=1S/C23H32F3N5O4/c1-21(2,3)16(30-20(35)23(24,25)26)19(34)31-10-13-14(22(13,4)5)15(31)18(33)29-12(9-27)8-11-6-7-28-17(11)32/h11-16H,6-8,10H2,1-5H3,(H,28,32)(H,29,33)(H,30,35)/t11-,12-,13-,14-,15-,16+/m0/s1; Key:LIENCHBZNNMNKG-OJFNHCPVSA-N

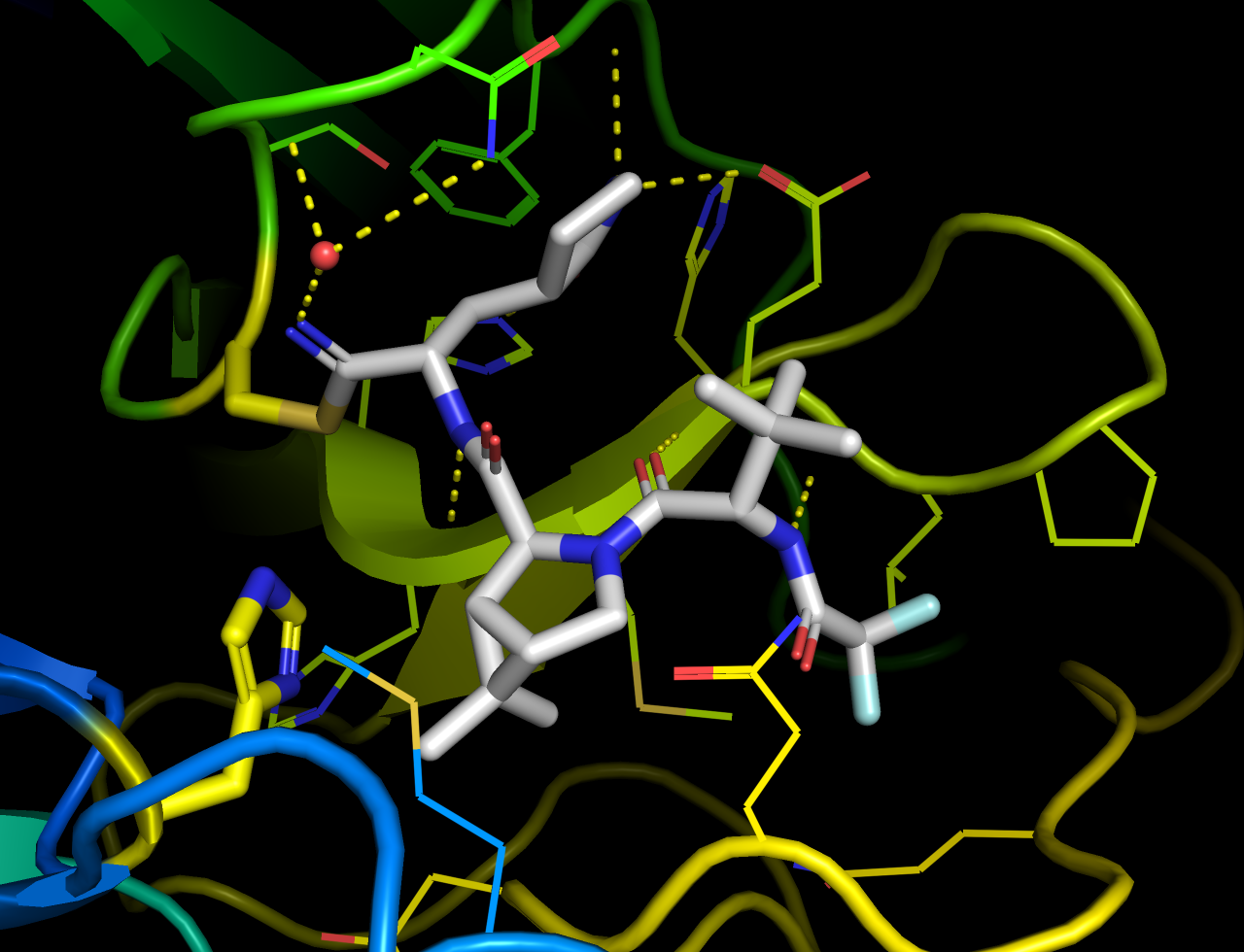
X-ray crystal structure (PDB:7SI9 and 7VH8) of the SARS-CoV-2 protease inhibitor nirmatrelvir bound to the viral 3CLpro protease enzyme. Ribbon diagram of the protein with the drug shown as sticks. The catalytic residues (His41, Cys145) are shown as yellow sticks.

Nirmatrelvir is an antiviral medication developed by Pfizer which acts as an orally active 3C-like protease inhibitor. It is part of a nirmatrelvir/ritonavir combination used to treat COVID-19 and sold under the brand name Paxlovid.

== Development ==
=== Pharmaceutical ===
Coronaviral proteases cleave multiple sites in the viral polyprotein, usually after there are glutamine residues. Early work on related human rhinoviruses showed that the flexible glutamine side chain in inhibitors could be replaced by a rigid pyrrolidone. These drugs had been further developed prior to the COVID-19 pandemic for other diseases including SARS. The utility of targeting the 3CL protease in a real world setting was first demonstrated in 2018 when GC376 (a prodrug of GC373) was used to treat the previously 100% lethal cat coronavirus disease, feline infectious peritonitis, caused by feline coronavirus. Nirmatrelvir and GC373 are both peptidomimetics, share the aforementioned pyrrolidone in P1 position and are competitive inhibitors. They use a nitrile and an aldehyde respectively to bind the catalytic cysteine. Pfizer investigated two series of compounds, with nitrile and benzothiazol-2-yl ketone as the reactive group, respectively, and in the end settled on using nitrile.

Nirmatrelvir was developed by modification of the earlier clinical candidate lufotrelvir, which is also a covalent protease inhibitor but its active element is a phosphate prodrug of a hydroxyketone. Lufotrelvir needs to be administered intravenously, limiting its use to a hospital setting. Stepwise modification of the tripeptide peptidomimetic led to nirmatrelvir, which is suitable for oral administration. Key changes include a reduction in the number of hydrogen bond donors, and the number of rotatable bonds by introducing a rigid bicyclic non-canonical amino acid (specifically, a "fused cyclopropyl ring with two methyl groups"), which mimics the leucine residue found in earlier inhibitors. This residue had previously been used in the synthesis of boceprevir.

Tert-leucine (abbreviation: Tle) used in the P3 position of nirmatrelvir was identified first as optimal non-canonical amino acid in potential drug targeting SARS-CoV-2 3C-like protease using combinatorial chemistry (hybrid combinatorial substrate library technology). The leucine-like residue resulted in loss of a nearby contact with a glutamine on the 3C-like protease. To compensate, Pfizer tried adding methane sulfonamide, acetamide and trifluoroacetamide, discovering that of the three, trifluoroacetamide resulted in superior oral bioavailability.

== Chemistry and pharmacology ==
Full details of the synthesis of nirmatrelvir were first published by scientists from Pfizer.

In the penultimate step a synthetic homochiral amino acid is coupled with a homochiral amino amide using the water-soluble carbodiimide EDCI as a coupling agent. The resulting intermediate is then treated with Burgess reagent, which dehydrates the amide group to the nitrile of the product.

Nirmatrelvir is a covalent inhibitor, binding directly to the catalytic cysteine (Cys145) residue of the cysteine protease enzyme.

In the co-packaged medication nirmatrelvir/ritonavir, ritonavir serves to slow the metabolism of nirmatrelvir via cytochrome enzyme inhibition, thereby increasing the circulating concentration of the main drug. This effect is also used in HIV therapy, where ritonavir is used in combination with another protease inhibitor to similarly enhance their pharmacokinetics.

== Society and culture ==
=== Licensing ===
In November 2021, Pfizer signed a license agreement with the United Nations–backed Medicines Patent Pool to allow nirmatrelvir to be manufactured and sold in 95 countries. Pfizer stated that the agreement will allow local medicine manufacturers to produce the pill "with the goal of facilitating greater access to the global population". The deal excludes several countries with major COVID-19 outbreaks including Brazil, China, Russia, Argentina, and Thailand.

=== Names ===
Nirmatrelvir is the international nonproprietary name

== Research ==
The research that led to nirmatrelvir began in March 2020, when Pfizer formally launched a project at its Cambridge, Massachusetts site to develop antiviral drugs for treating COVID-19. In July 2020, Pfizer chemists were able to synthesize nirmatrelvir for the first time. In September 2020, Pfizer completed a pharmacokinetic study in rats which suggested that nirmatrelvir could be administered orally. The actual synthesis of the drug for laboratory research and for clinical trials was carried out at Pfizer's Groton, Connecticut site.

In February 2021, Pfizer launched the company's first phase I trial of PF-07321332 (nirmatrelvir) at its clinical research unit in New Haven, Connecticut.

A study published in March 2023 reported that treatment with nirmatrelvir within five days of initial infection reduced the risk of long COVID relative to patients who did not receive Paxlovid.

A 2024 study found that "the time to sustained alleviation of all signs and symptoms of Covid-19 did not differ significantly between participants who received nirmatrelvir–ritonavir and those who received placebo."
