= 3CLpro-1 =

Chemical compound

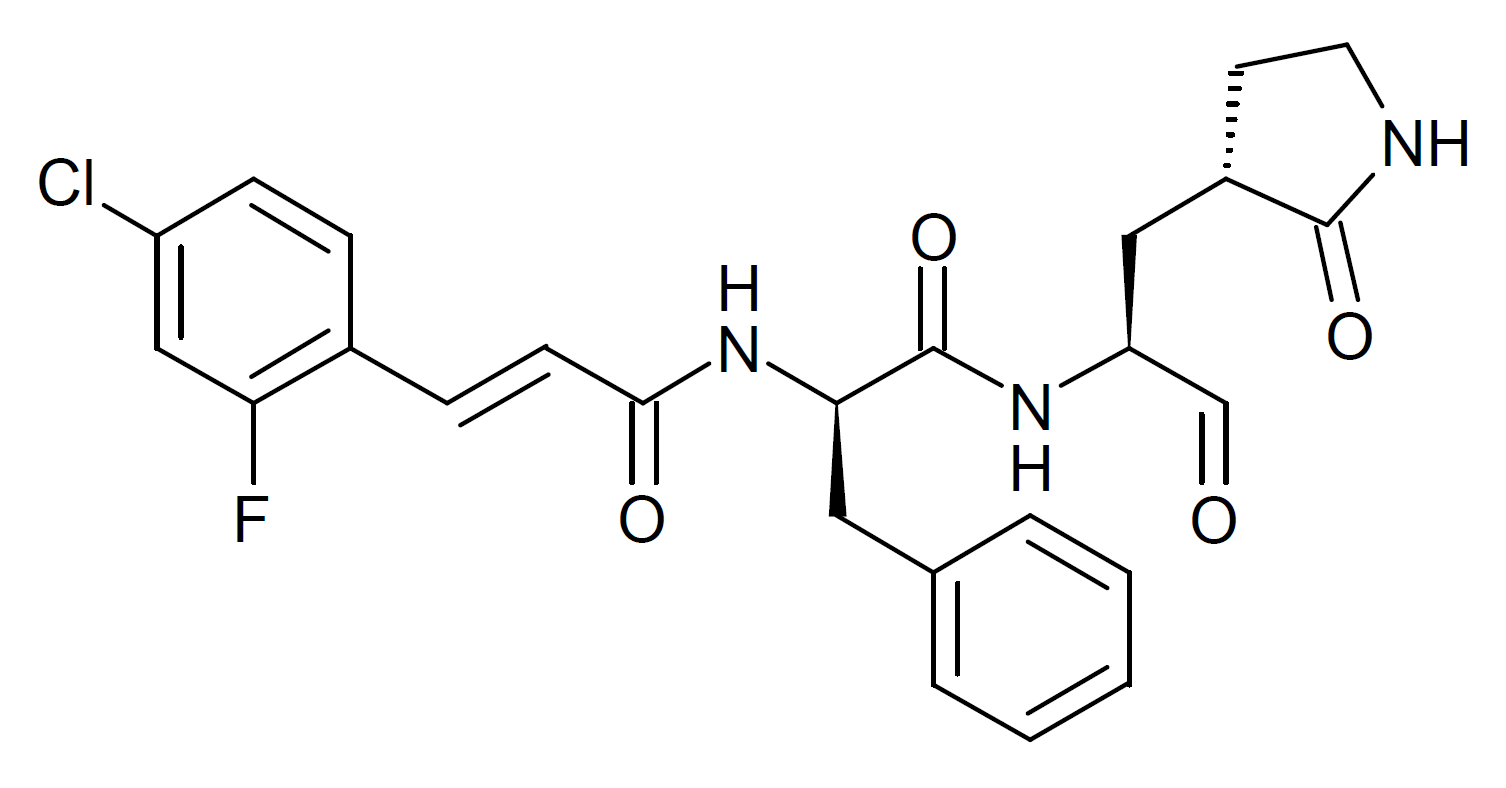

Clinical data
- Trade names: 3CLpro-1

Legal status
- Legal status: US: Investigational drug

Identifiers
- IUPAC name: (2S)-2-[[(E)-3-(4-chloro-2-fluorophenyl)prop-2-enoyl]amino]-N-[(2S)-1-oxo-3-[(3S)-2-oxopyrrolidin-3-yl]propan-2-yl]-3-phenylpropanamide
- CAS Number: 1065478-52-5
- PubChem CID: 44578386
- ChemSpider: 24697352
- UNII: LVW7NK5EFO
- ChEMBL: ChEMBL477164

Chemical and physical data
- Formula: C_{25}H_{25}ClFN_{3}O_{4}
- Molar mass: 485.94 g·mol^{−1}
- 3D model (JSmol): Interactive image
- SMILES: C1CNC(=O)[C@@H]1C[C@@H](C=O)NC(=O)[C@H](CC2=CC=CC=C2)NC(=O)/C=C/C3=C(C=C(C=C3)Cl)F
- InChI: InChI=1S/C25H25ClFN3O4/c26-19-8-6-17(21(27)14-19)7-9-23(32)30-22(12-16-4-2-1-3-5-16)25(34)29-20(15-31)13-18-10-11-28-24(18)33/h1-9,14-15,18,20,22H,10-13H2,(H,28,33)(H,29,34)(H,30,32)/b9-7+/t18-,20-,22-/m0/s1; Key:HXAHMXYAYHWWRI-ZCTWNQIISA-N

3CLpro-1 is an antiviral drug related to rupintrivir which acts as a 3CL protease inhibitor and was originally developed for the treatment of human enterovirus 71. It is one of the most potent of a large series of compounds developed as inhibitors of the viral enzyme 3CL protease, with an in vitro IC_{50} of 200 nM. It also shows activity against coronavirus diseases such as SARS and MERS, and is under investigation as a potential treatment agent for the viral disease COVID-19.

== See also ==
- Carmofur
- Ebselen
- GC376
- GRL-0617
- Iscartrelvir
- Rupintrivir
- Theaflavin digallate
