= Broad-spectrum therapeutic =

A broad-spectrum therapeutic is a type of antimicrobial active against multiple types of pathogens, such as an antibiotic that is effective against both bacteria and viruses. The opposite of a broad-spectrum drug is a narrow-spectrum therapeutic, which only treats a specific or very similar set of pathogens.

Such therapeutics have been suggested as potential emergency treatments for pandemics.

== See also ==
- Broad-spectrum antibiotic
- Broad-spectrum antiviral drug
