= GRL-0617 =

Chemical compound

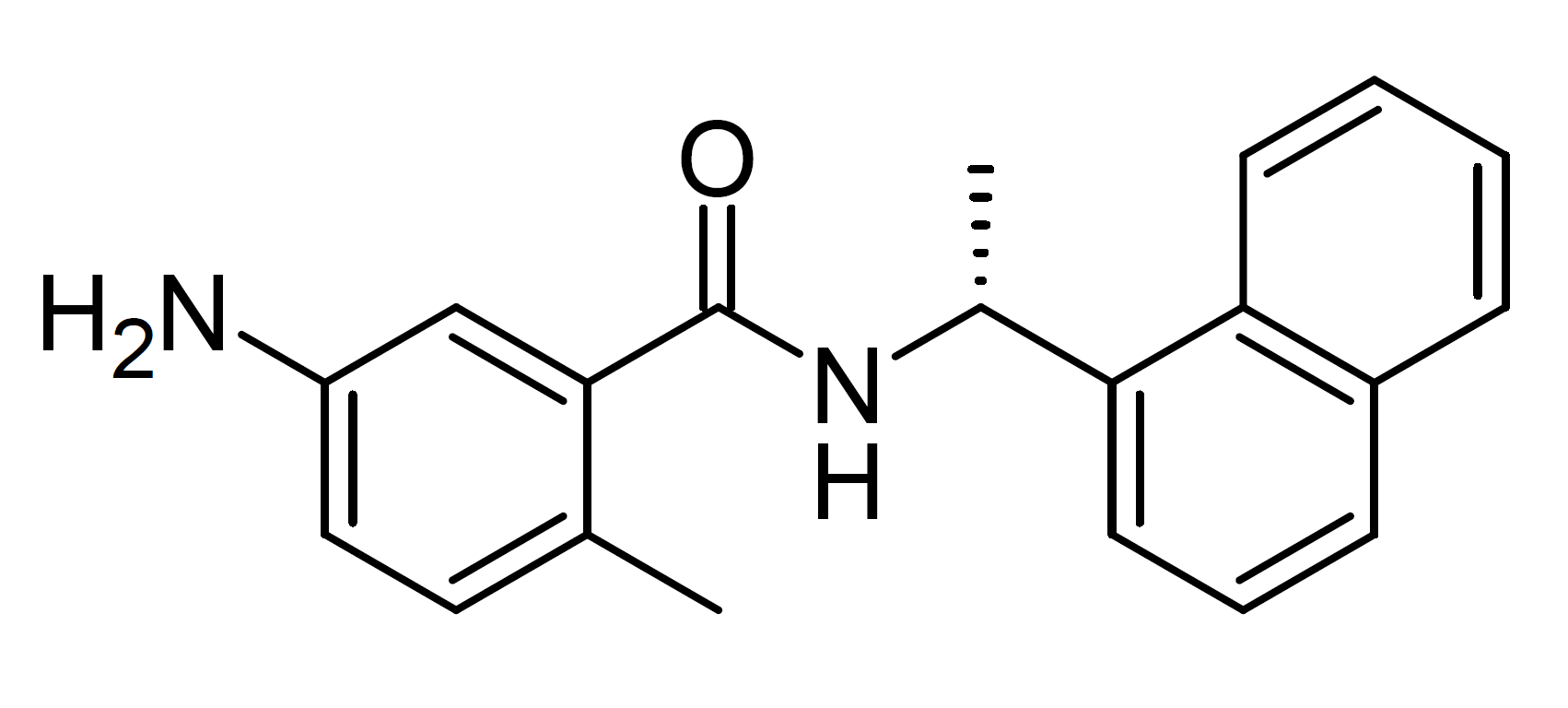

Identifiers
- IUPAC name: 5-amino-2-methyl-N-[(1R)-1-naphthalen-1-ylethyl]benzamide
- CAS Number: 1093070-16-6
- PubChem CID: 24941262
- IUPHAR/BPS: 11078
- DrugBank: DB08656
- ChemSpider: 24617535
- UNII: SQH4947NDN
- ChEBI: CHEBI:167176
- ChEMBL: ChEMBL549695
- CompTox Dashboard (EPA): DTXSID10660795

Chemical and physical data
- Formula: C_{20}H_{20}N_{2}O
- Molar mass: 304.393 g·mol^{−1}
- 3D model (JSmol): Interactive image
- SMILES: CC1=C(C=C(C=C1)N)C(=O)N[C@H](C)C2=CC=CC3=CC=CC=C32
- InChI: InChI=1S/C20H20N2O/c1-13-10-11-16(21)12-19(13)20(23)22-14(2)17-9-5-7-15-6-3-4-8-18(15)17/h3-12,14H,21H2,1-2H3,(H,22,23)/t14-/m1/s1; Key:UVERBUNNCOKGNZ-CQSZACIVSA-N

GRL-0617 is a drug which is one of the first compounds discovered that acts as a selective small-molecule inhibitor of the protease enzyme papain-like protease (PLpro) found in some human pathogenic viruses, including the coronavirus SARS-CoV-2. It has been shown to inhibit viral replication in silico and in vitro.

== See also ==
- 3CLpro-1
- Ebselen
- GC376
