= Riamilovir =

Chemical compound

Clinical data
- Trade names: Triazavirin
- Other names: TZV
- ATC code: J05AX32 (WHO)

Legal status
- Legal status: RU: Rx-only

Identifiers
- IUPAC name: 2-methylsulfanyl-6-nitro[1,2,4]triazolo[5,1-c] [1,2,4]triazin-7(4H)-one
- CAS Number: 123606-06-4; Sodium salt: 928659-17-0
- PubChem CID: 3113817
- DrugBank: DB15622
- ChemSpider: 2367718
- UNII: F2HTG1MH2D; Sodium salt: G1JE34QF2S
- KEGG: D13019
- ChEMBL: ChEMBL1618116
- CompTox Dashboard (EPA): DTXSID40389402
- ECHA InfoCard: 100.217.074

Chemical and physical data
- Formula: C_{5}H_{4}N_{6}O_{3}S
- Molar mass: 228.19 g·mol^{−1}
- 3D model (JSmol): Interactive image
- SMILES: CSc1[nH]n2c(=O)c(nnc2n1)[N+](=O)[O-]
- InChI: InChI=1S/C5H4N6O3S/c1-15-5-6-4-8-7-2(11(13)14)3(12)10(4)9-5/h1H3,(H,6,8,9); Key:IDVQGNMSSHPZSJ-UHFFFAOYSA-N

Riamilovir, sold under the brand name Triazavirin, is a broad-spectrum antiviral drug developed in Russia through a joint effort of Ural Federal University, Russian Academy of Sciences, Ural Center for Biopharma Technologies and Medsintez Pharmaceutical. It has a novel triazolotriazine core, which represents a new structural class of non-nucleoside antiviral drugs.

The principal action of riamilovir is to inhibit the synthesis of viral ribonucleic acid (RNA) and the replication of viral genomic fragments through its synthetic analogue to the bases of purine nucleosides.

== Medical uses ==
Riamilovir is used for the prevention and treatment of influenza, ARVI and COVID-19.

== Research ==
It was originally developed as a potential treatment for pandemic influenza strains, including lethal ones such as A(H1N1)pdm09, A(H3N2) and H5N1, and most of the trials conducted focused on anti-influenza activity. However, riamilovir has also been found to have antiviral activity against a number of other RNA viruses including COVID-19, tick-borne encephalitis virus, and is also being investigated for potential application against a lethal influenza infection and secondary bacterial pneumonia following influenza, Lassa fever and Ebola virus disease. Riamilovir has passed clinical trials and has shown antiviral activity against ARVI. In 2020, testing of riamilovir was started against SARS-CoV-2 in Russia, China, and South Africa. Randomized, double-blind, multicenter trial published in 2024 show that Riamilovir has demonstrated efficacy in both treating and preventing COVID-19.

In August 2014, the Ministry of Health of Russia issued a registration certificate for riamilovir (Triazavirin). The active substance of the drug triazavirin is a new active molecule, and can be dispensed by prescription. The production of riamilovir is carried out at a modern pharmaceutical enterprise LLC "Plant Medsintez". The registration procedure for riamilovir has begun in the Republic of South Africa.

== See also ==
- List of Russian drugs
