= Nirmatrelvir/ritonavir =

Antiviral combination medication

- Nirmatrelvir

- Ritonavir

Combination of
- Nirmatrelvir: Antiviral drug
- Ritonavir: CYP3A inhibitor; Antiviral drug

Clinical data
- Trade names: Paxlovid
- AHFS/Drugs.com: Monograph
- MedlinePlus: a622005
- License data: US DailyMed: Nirmatrelvir and ritonavir
- Pregnancy category: AU: B3; Not recommended
- Routes of administration: By mouth
- ATC code: J05AE30 (WHO)

Legal status
- Legal status: AU: S4 (Prescription only); CA: ℞-only; UK: POM (Prescription only); US: ℞-only and emergency use authorization; EU: Rx-only; In general: ℞ (Prescription only)

Identifiers
- KEGG: D12269
- ChEBI: CHEBI:192712

Nirmatrelvir/ritonavir, sold under the brand name Paxlovid, is a co-packaged medication used as a treatment for COVID-19. It contains the antiviral medications nirmatrelvir and ritonavir and was developed by Pfizer. Nirmatrelvir inhibits SARS-CoV-2 main protease, while ritonavir is a strong CYP3A inhibitor, slowing down nirmatrelvir metabolism and therefore boosting its effect. It is taken by mouth.

In unvaccinated high-risk people with COVID-19, nirmatrelvir/ritonavir can reduce the risk of hospitalization or death by 88% if taken within five days of symptom onset. People who take nirmatrelvir/ritonavir also test negative for COVID-19 about two and a half days earlier than people who do not. Side effects of nirmatrelvir/ritonavir include changes in sense of taste (dysgeusia), diarrhea, high blood pressure (hypertension), and muscle pain (myalgia).

In December 2021, the United States Food and Drug Administration (FDA) granted nirmatrelvir/ritonavir emergency use authorization (EUA) to treat COVID-19. It was approved in the United Kingdom later that month, and in the European Union and Canada in January 2022. In May 2023, it was approved in the US to treat mild-to-moderate COVID-19 in adults who are at high risk for progression to severe COVID-19, including hospitalization or death, relative to the general population. The FDA considers the combination to be a first-in-class medication. In 2023, it was the 159th most commonly prescribed medication in the United States, with more than 3 million prescriptions.

== Medical uses ==
In the United States, nirmatrelvir/ritonavir is indicated for the treatment of mild-to-moderate COVID-19 in adults who are at high risk for progression to severe COVID-19, including hospitalization or death. This includes people above 50, people with diabetes, cancer, coronary artery disease, chronic lung diseases, pregnancy, or on immunosuppressant drugs.

The co-packaged medication is not authorized or suggested for the pre-exposure or post-exposure prophylaxis of COVID-19.

In the European Union, the co-packaged medication is indicated for the treatment of COVID-19 in adults who do not require supplemental oxygen and who are at increased risk for progressing to severe COVID-19.

If administered within five days of symptom onset in confirmed COVID-19 infections, the efficacy of the co-packaged medication against hospitalization or death in unvaccinated high-risk adults, as of 2022, was about 88% (95% CI, 75–94%).

=== Pregnancy ===
The suggestion of the use of co-packaged medication during pregnancy in people who can become pregnant and are not using contraception, and for people who are breastfeeding, needs further study. Given the risk of morbidity, hospitalization and mortality associated with severe COVID-19 disease in females and fetuses, nirmatrelvir/ritonavir can provide an important option to reduce the risks associated with acute COVID-19 infection in at-risk and unvaccinated patients after careful consideration of the benefits and risks for each patient. There is limited human data on the use of nirmatrelvir during pregnancy related to the risk of congenital disabilities, spontaneous abortions (i.e., miscarriage), or adverse outcomes.

As of February 2026, data on the transfer of nirmatrelvir/ritonavir from breastfeeding parents to infants are limited. Nonetheless, Dai and colleagues reported in a 2024 article in Clinical Pharmacology & Therapeutics that the relative infant dose of drug conferred by breast milk was minimal and "well under the standard 10% safety threshold", supporting the use of the medication during pregnancy and breastfeeding. A temporary reduction in body weight was observed in the offspring of nursing rats. Other observational studies have also demonstrated the safety of ritonavir during pregnancy.

== Contraindications ==
The medication is contraindicated in those with hypersensitivity to either of the two main components, and in those with severely reduced kidney or liver function. Co-administration with certain drugs may have serious, sometimes fatal, effects.

== Side effects ==
Nirmatrelvir/ritonavir has a high potential for potentially serious drug interactions due to strong CYP3A inhibition by ritonavir. The US FDA label, the FDA fact sheet, and the FDA EUA contain a boxed warning about the CYP3A inhibition.

Adverse events of the co-packaged medication, regardless of causality, observed in the phase II-III EPIC-HR study included dysgeusia (6% vs. < 1% for placebo), diarrhea (3% vs. 2% for placebo), hypertension (1% vs. < 1% for placebo), and myalgia (1% vs. < 1% for placebo). In clinical trials, 2% of people discontinued treatment due to side effects with nirmatrelvir/ritonavir while 4% in the placebo group did so. Nirmatrelvir/ritonavir is under investigation, so its side effects have yet to be fully evaluated and may not be completely known.

Other side effects of nirmatrelvir/ritonavir may include hypersensitivity reactions, liver toxicity, and development of HIV drug resistance in people with uncontrolled or undiagnosed HIV infection. Hypersensitivity reactions (allergic reactions) may manifest as skin rash, hives, difficulty swallowing, difficulty breathing, angioedema, and/or anaphylaxis. Liver toxicity may manifest as elevated transaminases and clinical hepatitis, including symptoms like appetite loss, jaundice (yellowing of the skin and whites of eyes), dark-colored urine, pale-colored stools, itchy skin, and abdominal pain.

== Interactions ==
Co-administration of nirmatrelvir/ritonavir with certain drugs is contraindicated, including drugs dependent on CYP3A for removal, for which a raised concentration results in serious reactions, or those with potent CYP3A inducers, for which reduced blood concentration of the two main components may result in loss of effect against the virus and possible resistance, among others. Co-administration also affects the concentration of several drugs, sometimes requiring changing the dose or careful monitoring. Many of these drugs are widely prescribed to people at high risk from COVID‑19. With the extension of the emergency authorization in August 2022, the FDA updated a checklist to help evaluate potential drug interactions and other patient factors before prescribing Paxlovid, including more than 120 drugs that are contraindicated, should be avoided or held from use, or require dose adjustments or special monitoring.

Nirmatrelvir/ritonavir is safe to use in combination with over-the-counter pain- and fever-reducing medications such as paracetamol (acetaminophen) and ibuprofen.

== Pharmacology ==
Nirmatrelvir is responsible for the antiviral activity against SARS-CoV-2, while ritonavir works by inhibiting the metabolization of nirmatrelvir in the liver, strengthening its activity.

=== Pharmacodynamics ===
Nirmatrelvir is a SARS-CoV-2 main protease (M^{pro}, 3CL^{pro}, nsp5 protease) inhibitor while ritonavir is an HIV-1 protease inhibitor and strong CYP3A inhibitor. Nirmatrelvir is the main active agent in the formulation, while ritonavir, which inhibits HIV-1 protease, is a strong CYP3A inhibitor: it inhibits the metabolization of nirmatrelvir in the liver and thereby strengthens or boosts its activity. Ritonavir is not active against or thought to directly contribute to the medication's antiviral activity against SARS-CoV-2. Nirmatrelvir/ritonavir works against COVID‑19 by preventing the replication of SARS-CoV-2, which the SARS-CoV-2 main protease is essential for.

=== Pharmacokinetics ===
==== Absorption ====
The time to peak concentrations of nirmatrelvir combined with ritonavir is 3.00 hours (range 1.02–6.00 hours), while that of ritonavir is 3.98 hours. Peak concentrations of nirmatrelvir combined with ritonavir following a single dose (300 mg nirmatrelvir and 100 mg ritonavir) in healthy individuals are 2.21 μg/mL while total exposure is 23.01 μg•h/mL. Taking nirmatrelvir/ritonavir with a high-fat meal modestly increases exposure to nirmatrelvir (peak concentrations increased by 15% and total exposure increased by 1.6%) relative to taking them under fasting conditions.

==== Distribution ====
The volume of distribution (V_{z}/F) of nirmatrelvir combined with ritonavir is 104.7 L while that of ritonavir is 112.4 L. The blood-to-plasma ratio of nirmatrelvir combined with ritonavir is 0.60 while the red-blood-cell-to-plasma ratio of ritonavir is 0.14. The plasma protein binding of nirmatrelvir combined with ritonavir is 69% while that of ritonavir is 98 to 99%.

==== Metabolism ====
Nirmatrelvir is mainly a substrate of CYP3A in terms of its metabolism. But when it is combined with ritonavir, a strong CYP3A4 inhibitor, nirmatrelvir's metabolism is minimal and its elimination instead is mainly via renal excretion. Ritonavir is eliminated mainly by hepatic metabolism, with CYP3A4 the major enzyme involved and CYP2D6 the minor enzyme.

==== Elimination ====
Nirmatrelvir combined with ritonavir is excreted 35.3% in feces and 49.6% in urine, while ritonavir is excreted 86.4% in feces and 11.3% in urine.

The oral clearance (CL/F) of nirmatrelvir combined with ritonavir is 8.99 while that of ritonavir is 13.92. The elimination half-life of nirmatrelvir combined with ritonavir is (mean ± SD) 6.05 ± 1.79 hours while that of ritonavir is 6.15 hours. The half-life of nirmatrelvir combined with ritonavir makes the formulation suitable for administration every 12 hours.

==== Specific populations ====
The pharmacokinetics of nirmatrelvir/ritonavir based on age or gender have not been assessed. Exposure to nirmatrelvir/ritonavir was numerically lower in Japanese than in Western people, but not to a clinically meaningful extent. Peak concentrations, total exposure, time to peak concentrations, and elimination half-life of nirmatrelvir combined with ritonavir are severity-dependently increased in people with renal impairment, but not increased in people with moderate hepatic impairment. The combination has not been studied in people with severe hepatic impairment.

== Research ==
Early research indicates that treatment with nirmatrelvir/ritonavir during acute COVID-19 may reduce the risk of developing long COVID—also referred to as post-acute COVID condition and post-COVID condition, among others—compared to individuals who do not receive such treatment. In a January 2025 report in The New York Times on a Communications Medicine article by Cohen and colleagues, journalist Pam Belluck noted that nirmatrelvir/ritonavir may benefit some subpopulations of long COVID patients, though it was unclear which individuals were most likely to respond. The study, which included 13 long COVID patients undergoing extended treatment with the antiviral drug, yielded mixed results: nine patients experienced some improvement, five reported lasting effects, and four experienced no improvement. The findings highlighted the ongoing uncertainty about effective treatments for long COVID.

=== Rebound ===
A September 2022 post hoc analysis of EPIC-HR clinical trial data found that B.1.617.2 (i.e., delta) variant viral rebound (i.e., positive retest and symptom recurrence) occurred in 2.3% of those in the nirmatrelvir/ritonavir group and 1.7% of those in the placebo group between days 5 and 10 (or 14) of treatment. The groups were similar in outcomes across premorbidity, prior nirmatrelvir exposure and resistance, symptom severity, and baseline SARS-CoV-2 seropositivity statuses, as well as in the occurrence of hospitalization or death. The origin of viral rebound was unknown at the time, but there was speculation that reservoirs existed in tissues not reached by the medication and that true reinfections were culprits. In May 2022, Pfizer suggested repeating the treatment, but the FDA said there was no evidence of benefit.

In June 2022, a US case report of ten people with rebound COVID-19 found that viral load during rebound was comparable to levels during the initial infection and high enough to cause secondary transmission. President Joe Biden, First Lady Jill Biden, Anthony Fauci, Peter Hotez, and Rochelle Walensky are known to have experienced rebound. As of June 2022, Pfizer was studying the phenomenon in a new trial it called EPIC-SR ('standard risk') while the omicron variant was circulating. Both EPIC-HR and EPIC-SR were randomized-controlled trials that provided information about COVID-19 rebound. Data from the trials showed that rebound in SARS-CoV-2 (RNA or virus) shedding or COVID-19 symptoms occurred in a subset of participants and in participants receiving nirmatrelvir/ritonavir and the placebo. As of 2023, the FDA had not found a clear association between nirmatrelvir/ritonavir treatment and COVID-19 rebound based on available data.

=== Resistance ===
As of July 2022, no nirmatrelvir/ritonavir drug-resistant SARS-CoV-2 variants had been observed in a clinical context. The engineering of a nirmatrelvir-resistant chimera of vesicular stomatitis virus (VSV) under laboratory conditions was published without formal peer review in July 2022. As of November 2022, multiple pathways that could lead to resistance to nirmatrelvir/ritonavir had been demonstrated in vitro.

== History ==
Nirmatrelvir belongs to a family of 3C-like protease inhibitors developed in the late 2010s against feline coronavirus, while ritonavir is an antiretroviral drug developed in the 1980s and used since the 1990s to inhibit the enzyme that metabolizes other protease inhibitors.

The primary data supporting the US Food and Drug Administration (FDA) emergency use authorization for nirmatrelvir/ritonavir were from the EPIC-HR trial, a randomized, double-blind, placebo-controlled clinical trial studying nirmatrelvir/ritonavir for the treatment of non-hospitalized symptomatic adults with a laboratory-confirmed diagnosis of SARS-CoV-2 infection. Participants were 18 years of age and older with a pre-specified risk factor for progression to severe disease, or were 60 years and older regardless of pre-specified chronic medical conditions. No participants had received a COVID‑19 vaccine or been previously infected with COVID‑19. The main outcome measured in the trial was the proportion of people who were hospitalized due to COVID‑19 or died due to any cause during 28 days of follow-up. EPIC-HR started in July 2021, and completed in December 2021. Nirmatrelvir/ritonavir significantly reduced the proportion of people with COVID‑19-related hospitalization or death from any cause by 88% compared to placebo among participants treated within five days of symptom onset and who did not receive COVID‑19 therapeutic monoclonal antibody treatment. In December 2021, Pfizer also announced that a Phase II/III study of nirmatrelvir/ritonavir showed a reduced risk of hospitalization or death.

In August 2021, Pfizer began a phase II/III trial of nirmatrelvir/ritonavir for COVID‑19 in standard-risk individuals with COVID‑19 known as EPIC-SR. Interim results of this trial were announced in December 2021, and final results were released in June 2022. Pfizer discontinued enrollment in the study, with the reason given being the very low rate of hospitalization and death in this population. EPIC-SR was another clinical trial that enrolled vaccinated participants with at least one risk factor for progression to severe COVID‑19. Although not statistically significant, among these vaccinated participants, there was a reduction in the risk of COVID‑19 related hospitalization or death from any cause.

In December 2021, nirmatrelvir/ritonavir was granted emergency use authorization by the United States Food and Drug Administration (FDA) for the treatment of COVID‑19. In December 2021, the United Kingdom's Medicines and Healthcare products Regulatory Agency (MHRA) approved the use of nirmatrelvir combined with ritonavir for adults with mild to moderate infection and at high risk of their illness worsening.

In April 2022, it was announced that the PANORAMIC trial would start testing the effectiveness of nirmatrelvir/ritonavir for treating COVID‑19 infections.

Nirmatrelvir/ritonavir has been evaluated in the treatment of COVID‑19 in standard-risk individuals in the EPIC-SR trial. This study did not achieve its primary goal of reducing time to sustained alleviation of COVID‑19 symptoms (treatment: 13 days (95% CI 12–15 days); placebo: 13 days (95% CI 11–14 days)). It also did not find a statistically significant reduction in the risk of hospitalization or death (treatment: 5/576 [0.9%]; placebo: 10/569 [1.8%]; p > 0.05). Likewise, findings were not statistically significant for reducing hospitalization rates in a subgroup of vaccinated adults with at least one risk factor for severe COVID‑19 (treatment: 3/361 [0.8%]; placebo: 7/360 [1.9%]; 57% reduction – RR 0.43, 95% CI 0.11–1.64). However, the trial did find a statistically significant 62% decrease in COVID‑19-related medical visits, similar to the 67% reduction from the EPIC-HR study of high-risk individuals. Enrollment in EPIC-SR was discontinued due to the low rate of hospitalization and death in this population.

In May 2023, nirmatrelvir/ritonavir received FDA approval for the treatment of mild-to-moderate COVID‑19 in adults who are at high risk for progression to severe COVID‑19, including hospitalization or death. In November 2023, the FDA revised the EUA for nirmatrelvir/ritonavir to authorize EUA- or NDA-labeled nirmatrelvir/ritonavir for the treatment of mild-to-moderate COVID‑19 in people aged twelve years of age and older weighing at least 40 kilograms (88 lb), who are at high risk for progression to severe COVID‑19, including hospitalization. In March 2024, the FDA revised the EUA for nirmatrelvir/ritonavir to remove the authorization for EUA-labeled nirmatrelvir/ritonavir.

== Society and culture ==
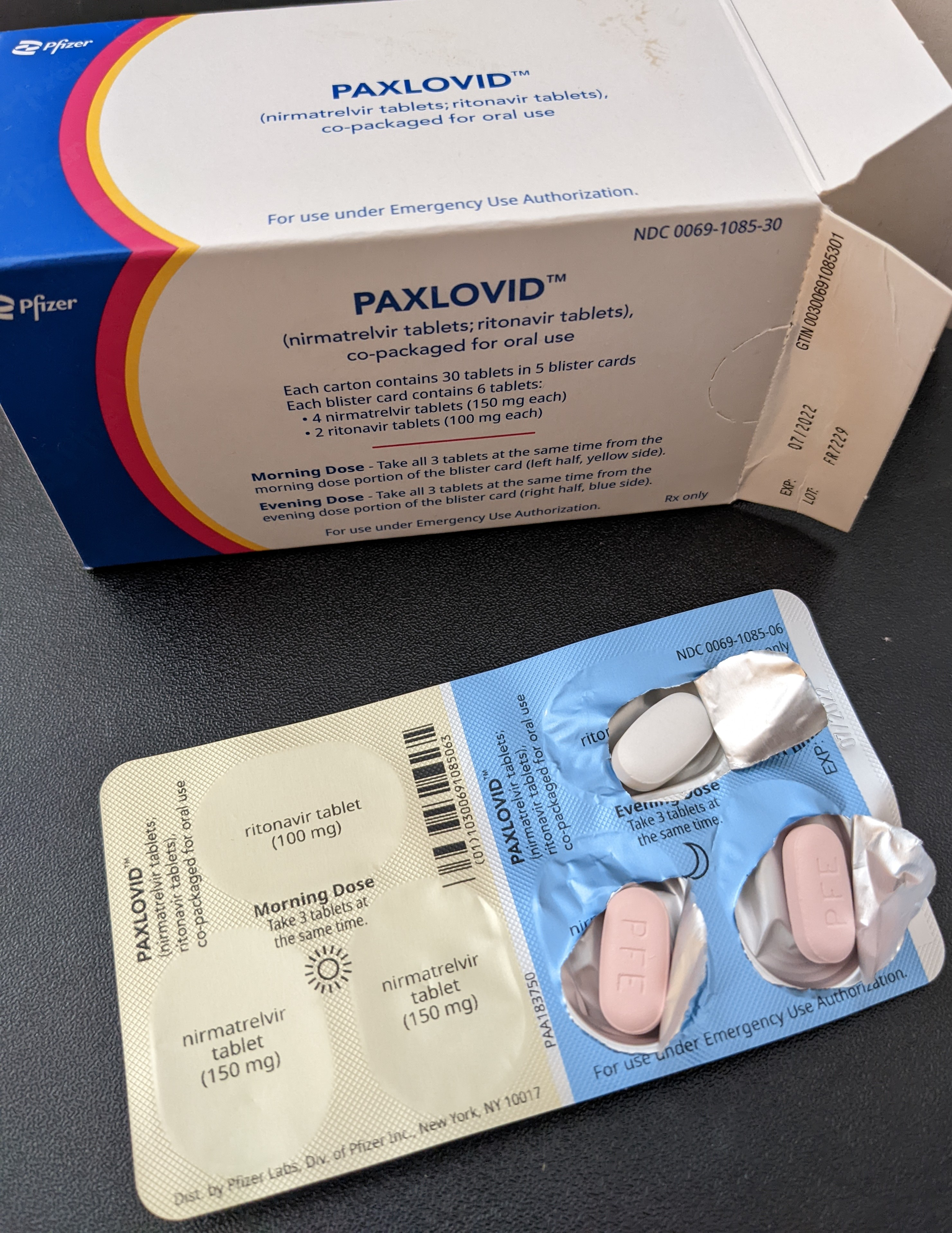
US packaging for Paxlovid, the branded form of nirmatrelvir/ritonavir, as of 2022

=== Legal status ===
==== Canada ====
Health Canada approved the use of the co-packaged medication in January 2022.

==== China ====
In February 2022, China approved the medication for the treatment of adults who have mild to moderate COVID‑19 and are at a high risk of progressing to a severe condition.

==== European Union ====
The European Medicines Agency (EMA) approved the co-packaged medication for the treatment of COVID‑19 in the EU in January 2022.

==== Israel ====
The Israeli Ministry of Health approved the use of the co-packaged medication in December 2021.

==== Japan ====
The Japanese Ministry of Health, Labour and Welfare approved the use of the co-packaged medication for treating adults in February 2022.

==== Singapore ====
The Singapore Health Sciences Authority approved the use of the co-packaged medication for treating adults in February 2022.

==== South Korea ====
South Korea approved the use of the co-packaged medication in December 2021.

==== United Kingdom ====
The United Kingdom approved the use of the co-packaged medication in December 2021.

==== United States ====
In November 2021, Pfizer submitted an application to the US Food and Drug Administration (FDA) for emergency use authorization for the co-packaged medication. The authorization was granted in December 2021, for people aged twelve years of age or older who are infected with COVID‑19 and are at risk.

In January 2024, the FDA revised the emergency use authorization (EUA) and stated that nirmatrelvir/ritonavir manufactured and labeled in accordance with the EUA under US distribution would remain authorized for use through the earlier of the labeled or extended expiration date, or through March 2024. In March 2024, the FDA revised the emergency use authorization to no longer cover EUA-labeled nirmatrelvir/ritonavir. As of November 2024, the FDA emergency use authorization for nirmatrelvir/ritonavir continues to authorize it for the treatment of people aged twelve years of age and older weighing at least 40 kilograms (88 lb) who are at high risk for progression to severe COVID-19, including hospitalization or death. The emergency use authorization also continues to authorize prescribing of nirmatrelvir/ritonavir by a state-licensed pharmacist to treat mild to moderate COVID-19 in people aged twelve years of age and older weighing at least 40 kilograms (88 lb) who are at high risk for progression to severe COVID-19, including hospitalization or death, in accordance with the FDA-approved prescribing information or authorized labeling, as applicable, and subject to certain conditions as detailed in the letter of authorization and the authorized fact sheet for health care providers.

=== Manufacturing ===
Pfizer selected its largest oral tablet factory in Freiburg as the launch facility for manufacturing the co-packaged medication. Nirmatrelvir, the novel portion of the co-packaged medication, was developed in the US and was initially manufactured in small amounts in Groton, Connecticut, to support clinical trials, but the Freiburg facility was responsible for figuring out how to mass-produce the co-packaged medication on an industrial scale. Pfizer selected another factory in Ascoli Piceno, Italy, to assist the Freiburg factory with packaging tablets into blister packs.

=== Economics ===
In December 2021, the German government ordered one million doses, but by August 2022, wholesalers had delivered only around 43,000 to pharmacies. In Germany, nirmatrelvir/ritonavir has been by prescription through physicians only, and German physicians have been reluctant to prescribe it. Hence, health minister Karl Lauterbach decided that general practitioners could stock five nirmatrelvir/ritonavir courses in their practice and dispense it directly to patients, that a prescription would be remunerated with 15 euros, and that every nursing home should appoint a vaccination officer as well as a nirmatrelvir/ritonavir officer. As of August 2022 the treatment guidelines German family doctors follow had not been updated since February 2022 and recommended nirmatrelvir/ritonavir only in unvaccinated risk patients, i.e., only a few people.

As of April 2022, the US had ordered 20 million nirmatrelvir/ritonavir courses. As of July 2022, the United States Department of Health and Human Services had set up at least 2,200 sites where people could receive nirmatrelvir/ritonavir as soon as they tested positive for the virus, including pharmacies, community health centers and long-term care facilities. In July 2022, the FDA allowed state-licensed pharmacists to prescribe it to people with COVID‑19 at high risk of progressing to severe disease.

Throughout 2022, only 10-12% of eligible US adult outpatients had received nirmatrelvir/ritonavir. Reasons are suspected to be concerns about "rebound, unfamiliarity with the treatment and cost" as well as "confusion around who's at high risk for severe disease". Paxlovid treatment was free through the end of 2024, for Medicare and Medicaid beneficiaries and insured persons covering out-of-pocket costs. Paxlovid continues to be free for some Medicare and Medicaid beneficiaries through the end of 2025, via the US Government Patient Assistance Program.

Pfizer reported revenue of US$1.279 billion for Paxlovid in 2023.

=== Brand names ===
Nirmatrelvir/ritonavir is sold under the brand name Paxlovid. Primovir and Paxista are generic versions manufactured and distributed in India.

=== Comparison to ivermectin ===
In 2021, it was falsely claimed that nirmatrelvir/ritonavir is a repackaged version of the antiparasitic drug ivermectin, or that nirmatrelvir/ritonavir is just like ivermectin as both are protease inhibitors. Ivermectin has been falsely promoted as a COVID‑19 therapeutic. Such claims arise from superficial similarities between the mechanism of action of the drugs and the claim that Pfizer is suppressing information about the benefits of ivermectin.
