= Ebselen =

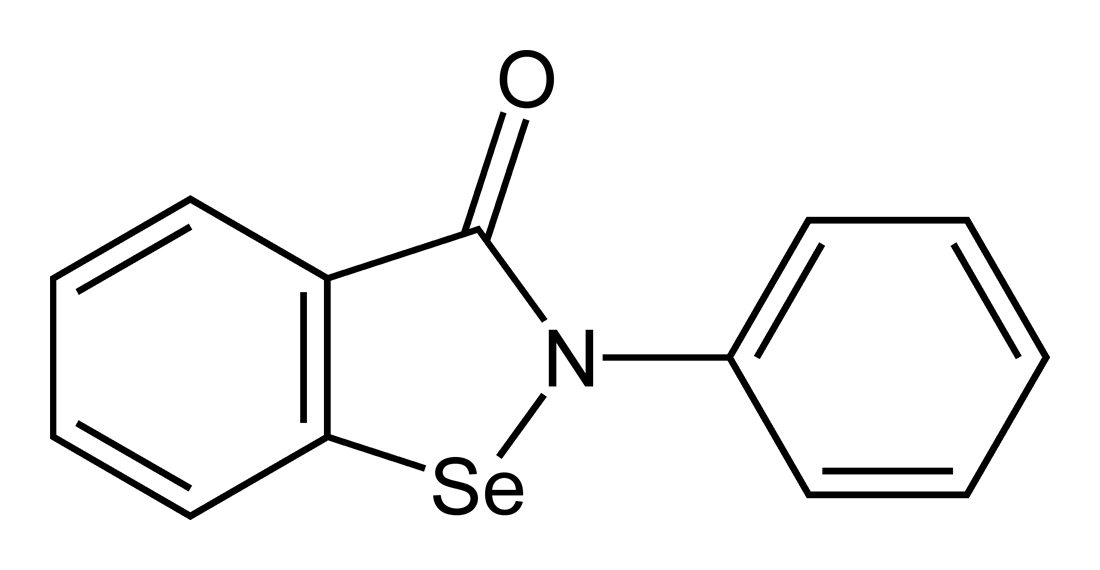
- Skeletal formula of ebselen

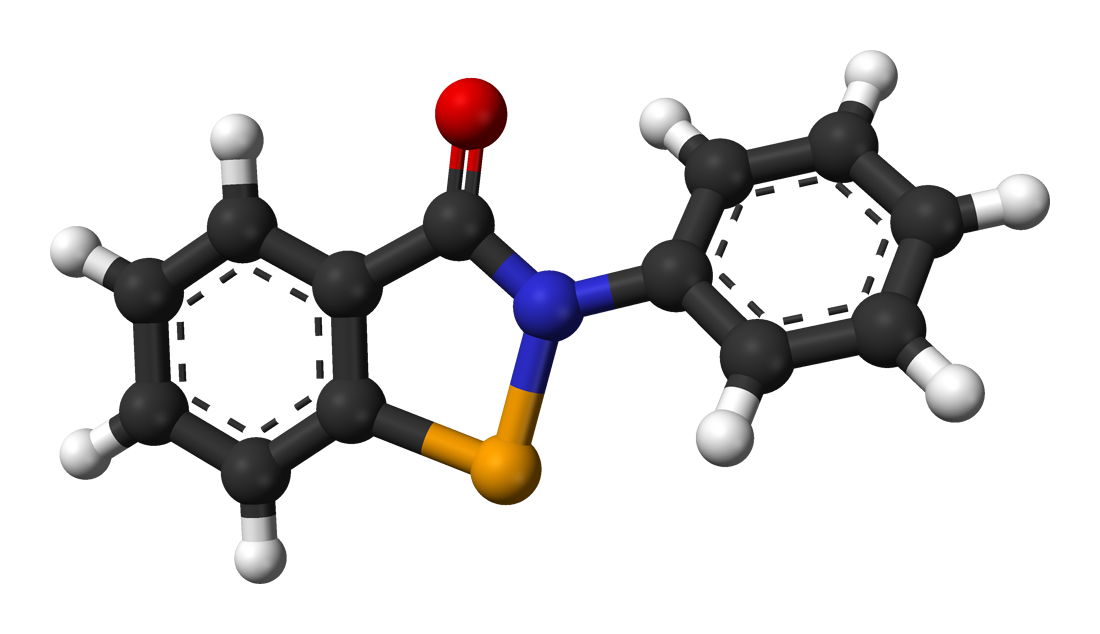
- Ball-and-stick model of the ebselen molecule

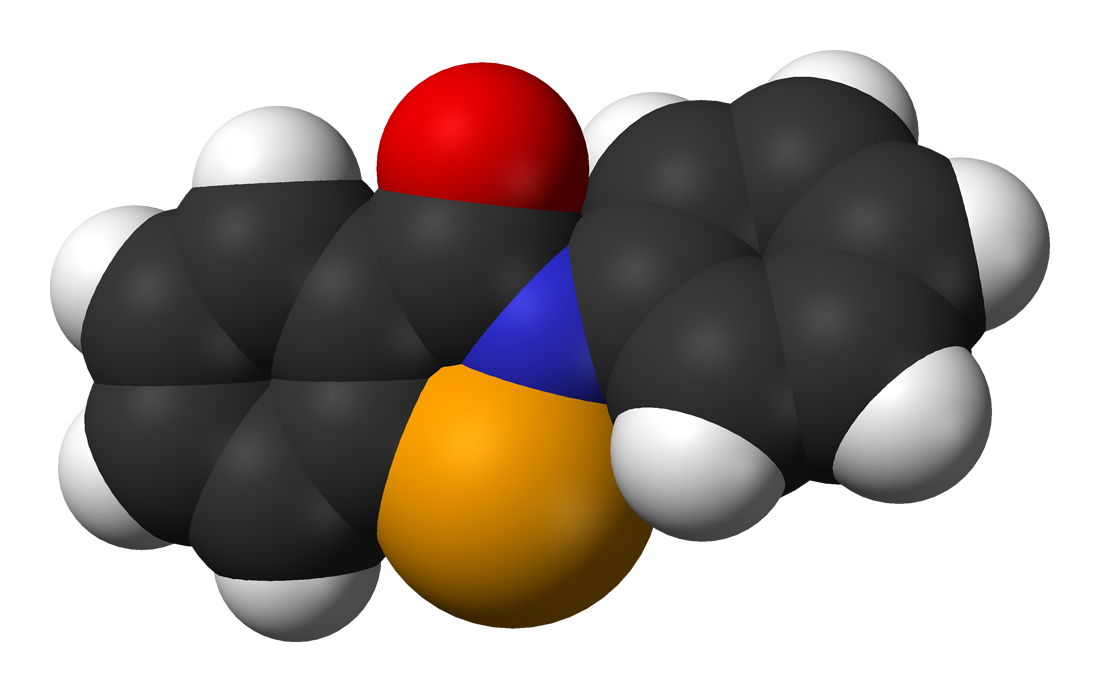

Names
- Preferred IUPAC name 2-Phenyl-1,2-benzoselenazol-3(2H)-one

Identifiers
CAS Number	60940-34-3
3D model (JSmol)	Interactive image; Interactive image
ChEBI	CHEBI:77543
ChEMBL	ChEMBL51085
ChemSpider	3082
ECHA InfoCard	100.132.190
PubChem CID	3194
UNII	40X2P7DPGH
CompTox Dashboard (EPA)	DTXSID7045150
- InChI: InChI=1S/C13H9NOSe/c15-13-11-8-4-5-9-12(11)16-14(13)10-6-2-1-3-7-10/h1-9H Key: DYEFUKCXAQOFHX-UHFFFAOYSA-N; InChI=1/C13H9NOSe/c15-13-11-8-4-5-9-12(11)16-14(13)10-6-2-1-3-7-10/h1-9H Key: DYEFUKCXAQOFHX-UHFFFAOYAZ
- SMILES: C1=CC=C(C=C1)N2C(=O)C3=CC=CC=C3[Se]2; O=C1c3ccccc3[Se]N1c2ccccc2

Properties
Chemical formula	C_{13}H_{9}NOSe
Molar mass	274.17666
- Except where otherwise noted, data are given for materials in their standard state (at 25 °C [77 °F], 100 kPa). verify (what is ?) Infobox references

Ebselen (also called PZ 51, DR3305, and SPI-1005), is a synthetic organoselenium molecule under preliminary investigation as a drug candidate. It belongs to the class of compounds related to benzene and its derivatives. It is being developed by the Seattle biotechnology company, Sound Pharmaceuticals, Inc. It has also been reported to target tubulin, blocking its polymerization.

Ebselen has been entered into clinical trials as a lead compound intended for the potential treatment of various diseases. Its most advanced clinical trial is a Phase III study in people with Meniere's disease, completed in July 2024.

In vitro, ebselen is a mimic of glutathione peroxidase and reacts with peroxynitrite. It is purported to have antioxidant and anti-inflammatory properties.

== Synthesis ==
Generally, synthesis of the characteristic scaffold of ebselen, the benzoisoselenazolone ring system, can be achieved either through reaction of primary amines (RNH_{2}) with 2-(chloroseleno)benzoyl chloride (Route I), by ortho-lithiation of benzanilides followed by oxidative cyclization (Route II) mediated by cupric bromide (CuBr_{2}), or through the efficient Cu-catalyzed selenation / heterocyclization of o-halobenzamides, a methodology developed by Kumar et al. (Route III).

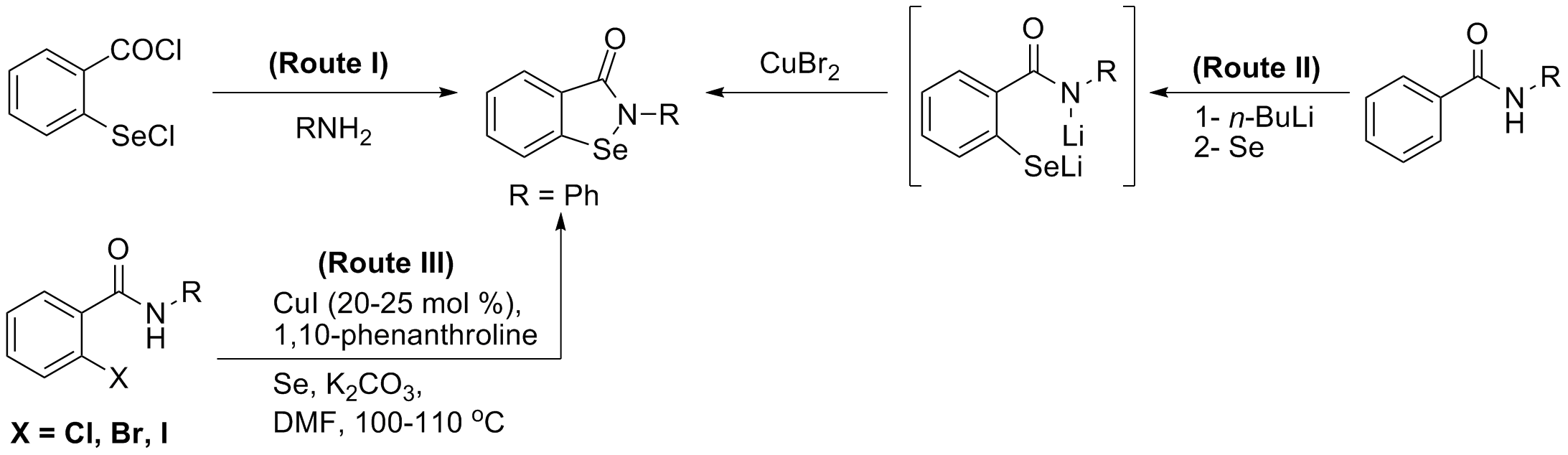

== History ==
The first patent for 2-phenyl-1,2-benzoselenazol-3(2H)-one was filed in 1980 and granted in 1982.

== Research ==
Ebselen is in preliminary clinical development for the potential treatment of hearing loss and depression, among other medical indications.

== See also ==
- List of investigational antidepressants
- List of investigational bipolar disorder drugs
