= Treatment and management of COVID-19 =

Mitigation of symptoms against the SARS-CoV-2-related disease

The treatment and management of COVID-19 combines both supportive care, which includes treatment to relieve symptoms, fluid therapy, oxygen support as needed, and a growing list of approved medications. Highly effective vaccines have reduced mortality related to SARS-CoV-2; for those awaiting vaccination, as well as for the estimated millions of immunocompromised persons who are unlikely to respond robustly to vaccination, treatment remains important. Some people may experience persistent symptoms or disability after recovery from the infection, known as long COVID, but there is still limited information on the best management and rehabilitation for this condition.

Most cases of COVID-19 are mild. In these, supportive care includes medication such as paracetamol or NSAIDs to relieve symptoms (fever, body aches, cough), proper intake of fluids, rest, and nasal breathing. Good personal hygiene and a healthy diet are also recommended. As of April 2020 the U.S. Centers for Disease Control and Prevention (CDC) recommended that those who suspect they are carrying the virus isolate themselves at home and wear a face mask. As of November 2020 use of the glucocorticoid dexamethasone had been strongly recommended in those severe cases treated in hospital with low oxygen levels, to reduce the risk of death. Noninvasive ventilation and, ultimately, admission to an intensive care unit for mechanical ventilation may be required to support breathing. Extracorporeal membrane oxygenation (ECMO) has been used to address respiratory failure, but its benefits are still under consideration. Some of the cases of severe disease course are caused by systemic hyper-inflammation, the so-called cytokine storm.

Although several medications have been approved in different countries as of April 2022, not all countries have these medications. Patients with mild to moderate symptoms who are in the risk groups can take nirmatrelvir/ritonavir (marketed as Paxlovid) or remdesivir, either of which reduces the risk of serious illness or hospitalization. In the US, the Biden Administration COVID-19 action plan includes the Test to Treat initiative, where people can go to a pharmacy, take a COVID test, and immediately receive free Paxlovid if they test positive. In November 2021, the UK approved the use of molnupiravir as a COVID treatment for vulnerable patients recently diagnosed with the disease.

Several experimental treatments are being actively studied in clinical trials. Others were thought to be promising early in the pandemic, such as hydroxychloroquine and lopinavir/ritonavir, but later research found them to be ineffective or even harmful, like fluvoxamine, a cheap and widely available antidepressant; In December 2020, two monoclonal antibody-based therapies were available in the United States, for early use in cases thought to be at high risk of progression to severe disease. The antiviral remdesivir has been available in the U.S., Canada, Australia, and several other countries, with varying restrictions; it is not recommended for people needing mechanical ventilation and has been discouraged altogether by the World Health Organization (WHO), due to limited evidence of its efficacy.

The WHO, the Chinese National Health Commission, the UK National Institute for Health and Care Excellence, and the United States' National Institutes of Health, among other bodies and agencies worldwide, have all published recommendations and guidelines for taking care of people with COVID-19. As of 2020 Intensivists and pulmonologists in the U.S. have compiled treatment recommendations from various agencies into a free resource, the IBCC.

== General support ==
Taking over-the-counter drugs such as paracetamol or ibuprofen, drinking fluids, taking honey to ease a cough, and resting may help alleviate symptoms.

== Medications ==
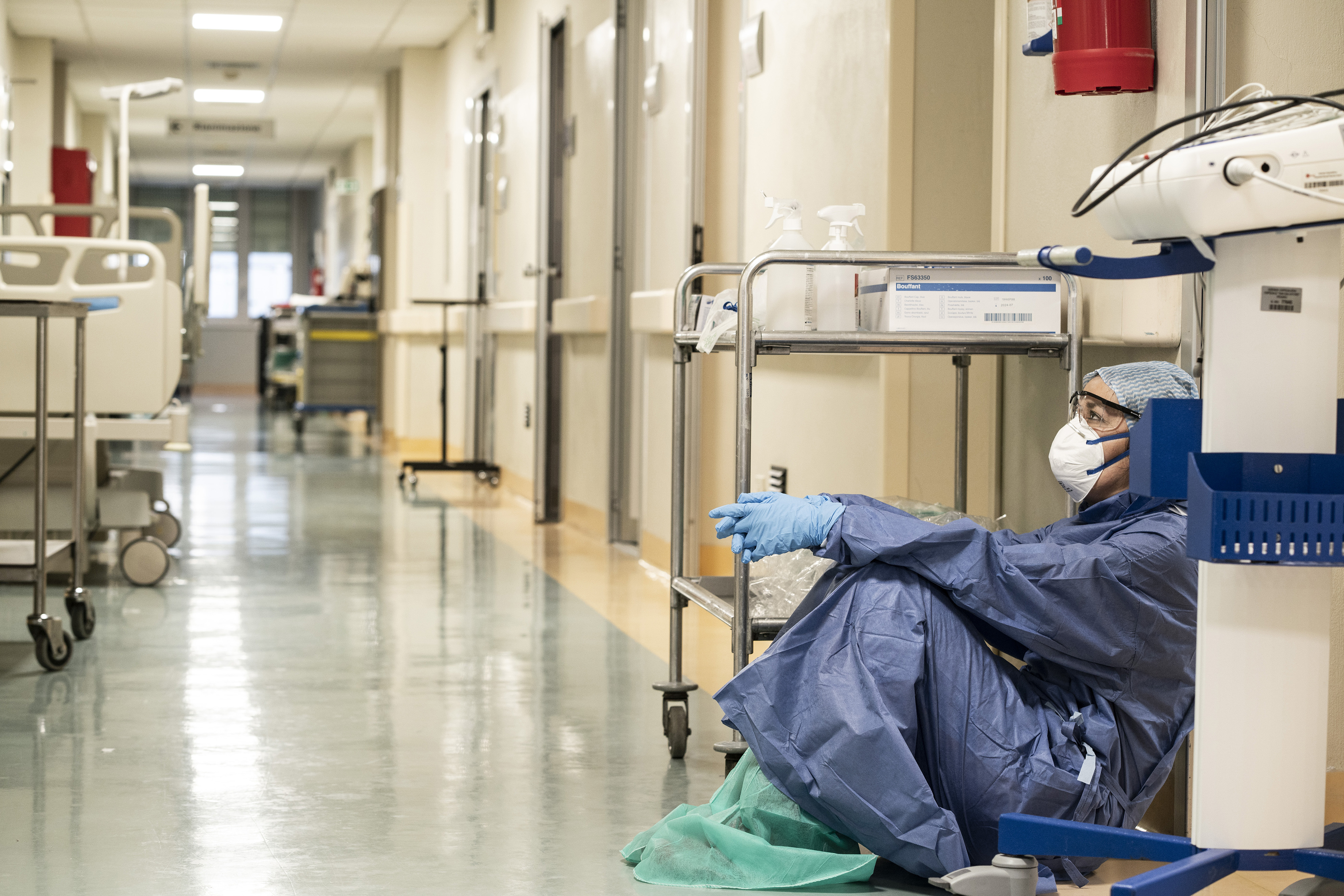
An exhausted anesthesiologist physician in Pesaro, Italy, March 2020

In the early months of the pandemic, many ICU doctors faced with the virus ventured to prescribe conjectured treatments because of the unprecedented circumstances. The standard of care for most intractable illnesses is that, as it develops over years, doctors build a body of research that tests various theories, compares and contrasts dosages, and measures one drug's power against another.

Antiviral development for SARS-CoV-2 has been disappointing. In January 2020, research into potential treatments started, and several antiviral drugs were in clinical trials. In February 2020 with 'no known effective' treatments, the WHO recommended volunteers take part in trials of the effectiveness and safety of potential treatments. Antiviral medications were tried in people with severe disease. As of March 2020 several medications were already approved for other uses or were already in advanced testing. As of April 2020 trials were investigating whether existing medications could be used effectively against the body's immune reaction to SARS-CoV-2 infection. As of May 2020 several antiviral drugs were under investigation for COVID-19, though none had been shown to be clearly effective on mortality in published randomized controlled trials.

As of February 2021, in the European Union, the use of dexamethasone and remdesivir were authorized. Corticosteroids like dexamethasone have shown clinical benefit in treating COVID-19. As of February 2021, the monoclonal antibody therapies bamlanivimab/etesevimab and casirivimab/imdevimab were found to reduce the number of hospitalizations, emergency room visits, and deaths. and both combination drugs received emergency use authorization by the US Food and Drug Administration (FDA).

As of February 2021 there were Emergency Use Authorizations for baricitinib, bamlanivimab, bamlanivimab/etesevimab, and casirivimab/imdevimab.

As of July 2021, outpatient drugs budesonide and tocilizumab showed promising results in some patients but remained under investigation. As of July 2021, a large number of drugs had been considered for treating COVID-19 patients. As of November 2022, there was moderate-certainty evidence suggesting that dexamethasone, and systemic corticosteroids in general, probably cause a slight reduction in all-cause mortality (up to 30 days) in hospitalized patients with COVID‐19, the evidence was very uncertain at 120 days.

In March 2022, the BBC wrote, "There are now many drugs that target the virus or our body in different ways: anti-inflammatory drugs that stop our immune system overreacting with deadly consequences, anti-viral drugs that make it harder for the coronavirus to replicate inside the body and antibody therapies that mimic our own immune system to attack the virus"

The WHO recommendations on which medications should or should not be used to treat COVID-19 are continuously updated. As of July 2022, WHO strongly recommended for non-severe cases nirmatrelvir and ritonavir, and recommended conditionally Molnupiravir, Sotrovimab and Remdesivir. For severe cases WHO strongly recommended corticosteroids, IL-6 receptor blockers or Baricitinib and conditionally recommended casirivimab and imdevimab.

For patients in a life-threatening stage of the illness and in the presence of poor prognostic predictors, early antiviral treatment is essential.

=== Ineffective treatments ===
As of 2020, several treatments had been investigated and found to be ineffective or unsafe, and are thus were not recommended for use; these include baloxavir marboxil, lopinavir/ritonavir, ruxolitinib, chloroquine, hydroxychloroquine, interferon β-1a, and colchicine. As of 2021, favipiravir and nafamostat had shown mixed results but were still in clinical trials in some countries.

During the early part of 2020 convalescent plasma, plasma from persons who recovered from SARS-CoV-2 infection, was frequently used with anecdotal successes in reports and small case series. Subsequent trials found no consistent evidence of benefit. Conflicting outcomes from trials can be understood by noting that they transfused insufficient therapeutic doses of CCP.

As of February 2021, in the United States, only remdesivir had FDA approval for certain COVID-19 patients, and while early research had suggested a benefit in preventing death and shortening illness duration, this was not borne out by subsequent trials.

On 16 April 2021, the FDA revoked the emergency use authorization (EUA) for the investigational monoclonal antibody therapy bamlanivimab, when administered alone, to be used for the treatment of mild-to-moderate COVID-19 in adults and certain pediatric patients.

As of July 2022, WHO strongly recommended against treating non-severe cases with convalescent plasma, hydroxychloroquine, lopinavir-ritonavir or colchicine and recommended conditionally against corticosteroids or ivermectin or fluvoxamine or nirmatrelvir and ritonavir WHO also strongly recommended against treating severe cases with hydroxychloroquine or lopinavir-ritonavir or Baricitinib and conditionally recommended against ruxolitinib or tofacitinib, ivermectin or convalescent plasma.

As of September 2022, oral treatment of outpatients with metformin, ivermectin, and fluvoxamine were found to be ineffective in a large randomized, controlled trial.

=== Adjuvant anticoagulation ===
In general there is no good evidence that anticoagulants have any benefit in the treatment of COVID-19, other than poor quality evidence suggesting a possible effect on all-cause mortality.

== Respiratory support ==
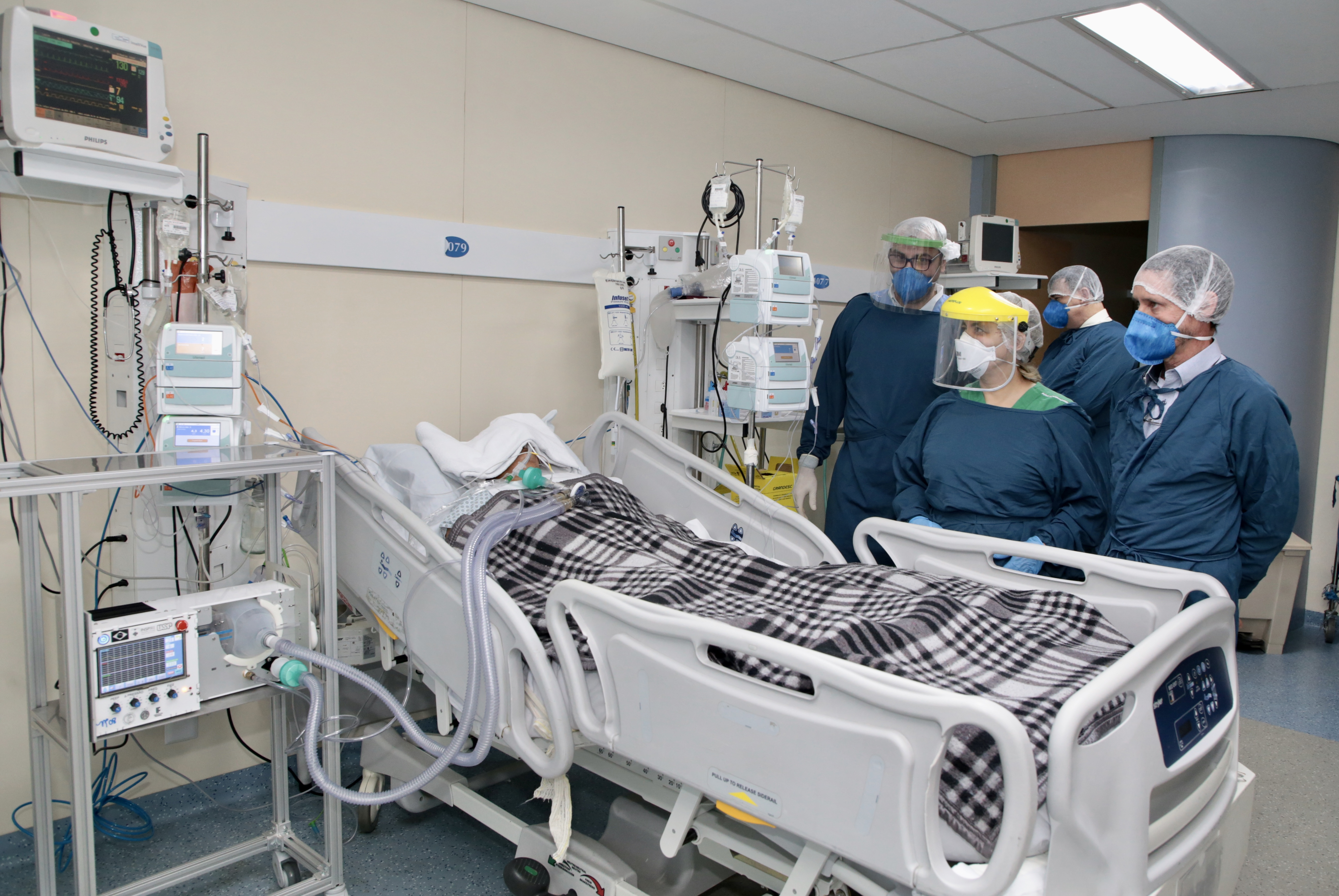
A critically ill patient receiving invasive ventilation in the intensive care unit of the Heart Institute, University of São Paulo, during the COVID-19 pandemic in Brazil. Due to a shortage of mechanical ventilators, a bridge ventilator is being used to automatically actuate a bag valve mask.

People seriously ill with COVID-19 may require respiratory support. Depending on the severity, oxygen therapy, mechanical ventilation, and intravenous fluids may be required.

=== Mechanical ventilation ===
Most cases of COVID-19 are not severe enough to require mechanical ventilation or alternatives, but a percentage of cases are. Some of the people acutely ill with COVID-19 experience deterioration of their lungs and acute respiratory distress syndrome (ARDS) and/or respiratory failure. Due to the high risk of death, urgent respiratory support including mechanical ventilation is often required in these people. Mechanical ventilation becomes more complex as ARDS develops in COVID-19 and oxygenation becomes increasingly difficult.

People who undergo mechanical ventilation are at risk of ventilator-associated lung injury or of worsening an existing lung injury, this damage is called ventilatory-induced lung injury (VILI). The mechanism of this injury is thought to be due to trauma to the lungs caused by aerated regions of the lungs being over swollen (overdistension of the aerated alveoli) and atelectrauma (force on the alveolar that could lead to lung collapse).

Ventilators capable of pressure control modes and optimal PEEP are needed to maximise oxygen delivery while minimising the risk of ventilator-associated lung injury and pneumothorax. An approach to enable the person to breathe spontaneously while being mechanically ventilated by adjusting the level of sedation and the respirator settings has been suggested, with the goal of reducing atrophy of the diaphragm. There is no clear evidence to suggest that enabling spontaneous breathing early while being mechanically ventilated is either beneficial or detrimental for the person's recovery.

Other approaches to mechanical ventilation including avoiding intubation using a high flow nasal cannula or bi-level positive airway pressure are under investigation; their effectiveness compared to intubation is not clear. Some doctors prefer staying with invasive mechanical ventilation when available because this technique limits the spread of aerosol particles compared to a high flow nasal cannula.

The administration of inhaled nitric oxide to people being ventilated is not recommended, and evidence around this practice is weak.

=== Extracorporeal membrane oxygenation ===
Extracorporeal membrane oxygenation (ECMO) is an artificial lung technology that has been used since the 1980s to treat respiratory failure and acute respiratory distress syndrome when conventional mechanical ventilation fails. In this complex procedure, blood is removed from the body via large cannulae, moved through a membrane oxygenator that performs the lung functions of oxygen delivery and carbon dioxide removal, and then returned to the body. The Extracorporeal Life Support Organization (ELSO) maintains a registry of outcomes for this technology, and as of September 2020 it has been used in less than 120,000 patients over 435 ECMO centers worldwide with 40% mortality for adult respiratory patients.

Initial use of ECMO in COVID-19 patients from China early in the pandemic suggested poor outcomes, with less than 90% mortality. In March 2020, the ELSO registry began collecting data on the worldwide use of ECMO for patients with COVID-19 and reporting this data on the ELSO website in real time. In September 2020, the outcomes of 1,035 COVID-19 patients supported with ECMO from 213 experienced centers in 36 different countries were published in The Lancet, and demonstrated 38% mortality, which is similar to many other respiratory diseases treated with ECMO. The mortality is also similar to the 35% mortality seen in the EOLIA trial, the largest randomized controlled trial for ECMO in ARDS. This registry based, multi-center, multi-country data provide provisional support for the use of ECMO for COVID-19 associated acute hypoxemic respiratory failure. Given that this is a complex technology that can be resource intense, guidelines exist for the use of ECMO during the COVID-19 pandemic.

== Psychological support ==
Individuals may experience distress from quarantine, travel restrictions, side effects of treatment, or fear of the infection itself. To address these concerns, the National Health Commission of China published a national guideline for psychological crisis intervention on 27 January 2020.

According to the Inter-Agency Standing Committee (IASC) Guidelines on Mental Health and Psychosocial Support, the pandemic produced long-term consequences. Deterioration of social networks and economies, survivor stigma, anger and aggression, and mistrust of official information are long-term consequences.

In April 2020 The Lancet published a 14-page call for action focusing on the UK and stated conditions were such that a range of mental health issues was likely to become more common. BBC quoted Rory O'Connor in saying, "Increased social isolation, loneliness, health anxiety, stress, and an economic downturn are a perfect storm to harm people's mental health and wellbeing."

== Special populations ==
=== Concurrent treatment of other conditions ===
Early in the pandemic, theoretical concerns were raised about ACE inhibitors and angiotensin receptor blockers. Research in March 2020 found no evidence to justify stopping these medications in people who take them for conditions such as high blood pressure. One study from April 2020 found that people with COVID-19 and hypertension had lower all-cause mortality when on these medications. Similar concerns were raised about non-steroidal anti-inflammatory drugs (NSAIDs) such as ibuprofen; these were likewise not borne out, and NSAIDs may both be used to relieve symptoms of COVID-19 and continue to be used by people who take them for other conditions.

People who use topical or systemic corticosteroids for respiratory conditions such as asthma or chronic obstructive pulmonary disease should continue taking them as prescribed even if they contract COVID-19.

The principal for obstetric management of COVID-19 include rapid detection, isolation, and testing, profound preventive measures, regular monitoring of fetus as well as of uterine contractions, peculiar case-to-case delivery planning based on severity of symptoms, and appropriate post-natal measures for preventing infection.

=== Patients with simultaneous influenza infection ===
Patients with simultaneous SARS CoV2 and influenza infection are more than twice as likely to die and more than four times as likely to need ventilation as patients with only COVID. It is recommended that patients admitted to hospital with COVID should be routinely tested to see if they also have influenza. The public are advised to get vaccinated against both Influenza and COVID.

== Epidemiology ==
Severe cases are most common in older adults (those older than 60 years, and especially those older than 80 years). Many developed countries do not have enough hospital beds per capita, which limits a health system's capacity to handle a sudden spike in the number of COVID-19 cases severe enough to require hospitalisation. This limited capacity is a significant driver behind calls to flatten the curve. One study in China found 5% were admitted to intensive care units, 2.3% needed mechanical support of ventilation, and 1.4% died. In China, approximately 30% of people in hospital with COVID-19 are eventually admitted to ICU.
