= Bebtelovimab =

Medication

Monoclonal antibody
- Type: Whole antibody
- Source: Human
- Target: Spike protein of SARS-CoV-2

Clinical data
- Pronunciation: /ˌbɛbtɪˈloʊvɪmæb/ BEB-tih-LOHV-ih-mab
- Other names: LY-CoV1404, LY3853113
- License data: US DailyMed: Bebtelovimab
- Routes of administration: Intravenous
- ATC code: None

Legal status
- Legal status: US: Withdrawn

Identifiers
- KEGG: D12174

Bebtelovimab is a monoclonal antibody developed by AbCellera and Eli Lilly as a treatment for COVID-19.

Possible side effects include itching, rash, infusion-related reactions, nausea and vomiting.

Bebtelovimab works by binding to the spike protein of the virus that causes COVID-19, similar to other monoclonal antibodies that have been authorized for the treatment of high-risk people with mild to moderate COVID-19 and shown a benefit in reducing the risk of hospitalization or death. Bebtelovimab is a neutralizing human immunoglobulin G1 (IgG1) monoclonal antibody, isolated from a patient who has recovered from the Coronavirus disease 2019 (COVID-19), directed against the spike (S) protein of severe acute respiratory syndrome coronavirus-2 (SARS-CoV-2), that can potentially be used for immunization against COVID-19.

As of November 2022, bebtelovimab is not authorized for emergency use in the US because it is not expected to neutralize Omicron subvariants BQ.1 and BQ.1.1.

== Medical uses ==
Bebtelovimab was granted an emergency use authorization (EUA) by the US Food and Drug Administration (FDA) in February 2022, and revoked it in November 2022. The EUA for bebtelovimab is for the treatment of mild to moderate COVID-19 in people aged 12 years of age and older weighing at least 40 kilograms (88 lb) with a positive COVID-19 test, and who are at high risk for progression to severe COVID-19, including hospitalization or death, and for whom alternative COVID-19 treatment options approved or authorized by the FDA are not accessible or clinically appropriate.

Bebtelovimab is not authorized for people who are hospitalized due to COVID-19 or require oxygen therapy due to COVID-19. Treatment with bebtelovimab has not been studied in people hospitalized due to COVID-19.

Bebtelovimab is not expected to neutralize Omicron subvariants BQ.1 and BQ.1.1.

== History ==
Bebtelovimab emerged from a collaboration between Eli Lilly and AbCellera. Bebtelovimab was discovered by AbCellera and the National Institute of Allergy and Infectious Diseases (NIAID) Vaccine Research Center.

== Society and culture ==
=== Legal status ===
Bebtelovimab was authorized for medical use in the United States via an emergency use authorization in February 2022.

As of November 2022, bebtelovimab is not authorized for emergency use in the US because it is not expected to neutralize Omicron subvariants BQ.1 and BQ.1.1. Eli Lilly and its authorized distributors have paused commercial distribution of bebtelovimab until further notice by the U.S. Food and Drug Administration (FDA).

=== Names ===
Bebtelovimab is the proposed international nonproprietary name (pINN).
