= AbCellera =

Biotechnology company in Vancouver, Canada

AbCellera Biologics Inc.
- Company type: Public
- Traded as: Nasdaq: ABCL
- Industry: Biotechnology; Pharmaceutical
- Founded: 2012; 14 years ago
- Headquarters: Vancouver, British Columbia
- Revenue: 38 million (2023)
- Net income: ▼US $-163 million (2024)
- Number of employees: 596 (2024)
- Website: abcellera.com

AbCellera Biologics Inc. is a Vancouver, British Columbia-based biotechnology company that discovers and develops antibody therapeutics. The company is best known for its leading role in the Pandemic Prevention Platform, a project of DARPA's Biological Technologies Office. AbCellera utilizes a proprietary technology platform, which they claim can develop "medical countermeasures within 60 days." Its platform for single-cell screening was initially developed at the University of British Columbia.

== History ==
AbCellera was founded in 2012 by biomedical researchers Carl Hansen, Véronique Lecault, Kevin Heyries, Daniel Da Costa, Kathleen Lisaingo, and Oleh Petriv. In November 2016, the company received a US$645K grant from the Bill & Melinda Gates Foundation to develop a test for tuberculosis. In September 2018, a $10M series A round of funding was closed. In May 2020, a $105M series B round of funding was closed.

In January 2017, AbCellera announced that it would be collaborating with Pfizer to discover and develop antibodies against "undisclosed membrane protein targets.”

In September 2021, the company announced a multi-year agreement with Moderna to develop mRNA-based antibody treatments against multiple diseases.

In January 2022, the company received a $1.5 million grant from the Bill & Melinda Gates Foundation to identify monoclonal antibodies against respiratory syncytial virus (RSV).

== Product development ==
=== COVID-19 treatments ===
In June 2020, AbCellera announced it had begun the world's first study of a potential antibody treatment against COVID-19, with a Phase 1 trial of LY-CoV555 (Bamlanivimab), in collaboration with Eli Lilly and Company. The drug was granted an Emergency Use Authorization by the U.S. Food and Drug Administration in November 2020, and subsequently renewed in February and March 2021. The EUA was revoked in April 2021, with the FDA citing an updated conclusion that "the known and potential benefits of bamlanivimab alone no longer outweigh the known and potential risks for the product," because of significantly reduced efficacy against emerging variants of SARS-CoV-2.

A second COVID-19 antibody - Bebtelovimab - was given Emergency Use Authorization in February 2022, with the U.S. Government committing to a $720 million purchase of up to 600,000 doses. The FDA revoked the authorization in November 2022 as the drug was no longer expected to be effective against new subvariants of the virus.

=== ABCL635 ===
In May 2025, AbCellera received authorization from Health Canada to begin a Phase 1 clinical trial of ABCL635, an antibody targeting NK3R that is being developed for the treatment of moderate-to-severe vasomotor symptoms in menopausal women. The first patient was dosed in August 2025.

=== ABCL575 ===
In May 2025, AbCellera received authorization from Health Canada to begin a Phase 1 clinical trial of ABCL575, an antibody targeting OX40 ligand for the treatment of moderate-to-severe atopic dermatitis. The first patient was dosed in August 2025.

=== ABCL688 ===
In August 2025, AbCellera announced that ABCL688, an antibody targeting an undisclosed GPCR or ion channel target involved in autoimmune disease, had entered into IND-enabling studies with Phase 1 trials expected to begin in 2026.
