= Social stigma associated with COVID-19 =

Discrimination towards people based on perceived links to COVID-19

Due to the ongoing COVID-19 pandemic, people can sometimes be labelled, stereotyped, discriminated against, treated separately, or experience loss of status because of real or perceived links with the disease. As a result of such treatment, those who have or are perceived to have the disease, as well as their caregivers, family, friends, and communities, may be subjected to social stigma.

Due to the social stigma, individuals and groups have been subjected to racism, xenophobia, and hate crimes, including physical attacks. The groups shown to be most vulnerable to this social stigma are Asian people, in particular those of East Asian and Southeast Asian descent or appearance, people who have traveled abroad, people who have recently completed quarantine, healthcare professionals, and emergency service workers.

It has also been shown that wearing or refusing to wear a mask has become subject to stigma. The existence of such social stigma and their negative impacts have been documented by many organizations, including UNICEF, the WHO, and the CDC.

== Reasons for and impact of social stigma ==
The level of stigma towards those affected with COVID-19 stems from multiple factors. Due to the novelty of the virus, there are many unknowns surrounding transmission and a possible cure. Many people cannot access tests and drug development for treatment is still in progress. Meanwhile, there is widespread misinformation regarding the disease, under which various online groups and activists have spread conspiracy theories and unproven claims, including: that the virus was created in a laboratory; the virus was "planned"; and that the virus was caused by 5G networks, among other theories.

In this cultural context, the disease itself is an unknown—and, according to many international health experts, people feel fearful when confronted with the unknown. In such circumstances, they may deal with this fear by assigning blame to the "other," which may include groups of people, governments, or institutions. This environment can fuel harmful stereotypes. As a result, social cohesion is undermined, and there may be increased social isolation of impacted groups. Due to this social isolation, people may be less likely to seek out medical help or services, take necessary precautions, or seek out social services, due to fear of discrimination. This can contribute to a situation in which the virus is more likely to spread, leading to severe health problems and difficulties in controlling disease outbreak. People could also be subjected to physical violence and hate crimes.

== Addressing social stigma ==
Stigma related to COVID-19 can be countered by building trust in reliable health services and showing empathy to affected individuals.

Health organizations such as UNICEF and the Mayo Clinic recommend that media use people-first language when discussing the pandemic to avoid unnecessary negative tone. For instance, the official name 'COVID-19' or the colloquial term 'coronavirus' is preferred instead of 'Chinese virus', 'Wuhan virus' or 'Asian virus', which attach ethnicities or locations to the disease. UNICEF and the WHO also recommend the usage of 'people who have COVID-19' instead of 'COVID-19 cases' or 'COVID-19 victims'. Phrasing that implies malice is discouraged, so that 'acquiring' or 'contracting' COVID-19 is used rather than 'transmitting' or 'spreading' COVID-19. Advocates stated these recommendations reduce the negative connotations and subconscious dehumanization that could result from emphasizing disease status.

To counter misinformation, UNICEF advises public figures to share facts based on latest scientific evidence as opposed to unsubstantiated rumors. Social media users are encouraged to share sympathetic stories of recovery and treatment while maintaining cultural sensitivity. These recommendations are intended to diminish the panic that might result from fear-mongering and exaggerated terms such as 'plague' or 'apocalypse'. Public figures are encouraged to use simple language and correct misconceptions while acknowledging any individual feeling or reactions to the pandemic. According to UNICEF and the WHO, accurate information can reduce stigma caused by fear of the unknown.
