= Sotrovimab =

Monoclonal antibody

Monoclonal antibody
- Type: Whole antibody
- Source: Human
- Target: Spike protein of SARS-CoV-2

Clinical data
- Trade names: Xevudy
- Other names: VIR-7831, GSK4182136
- AHFS/Drugs.com: Monograph
- MedlinePlus: a621037
- License data: US DailyMed: Sotrovimab
- Pregnancy category: AU: B2
- Routes of administration: Intravenous
- ATC code: J06BD05 (WHO)

Legal status
- Legal status: AU: S4 (Prescription only); CA: ℞-only / Schedule D; UK: POM (Prescription only); US: ℞-only via emergency use authorization; EU: Rx-only

Identifiers
- CAS Number: 2423014-07-5
- IUPHAR/BPS: 11333
- DrugBank: DB16355
- UNII: 1MTK0BPN8V
- KEGG: D12014

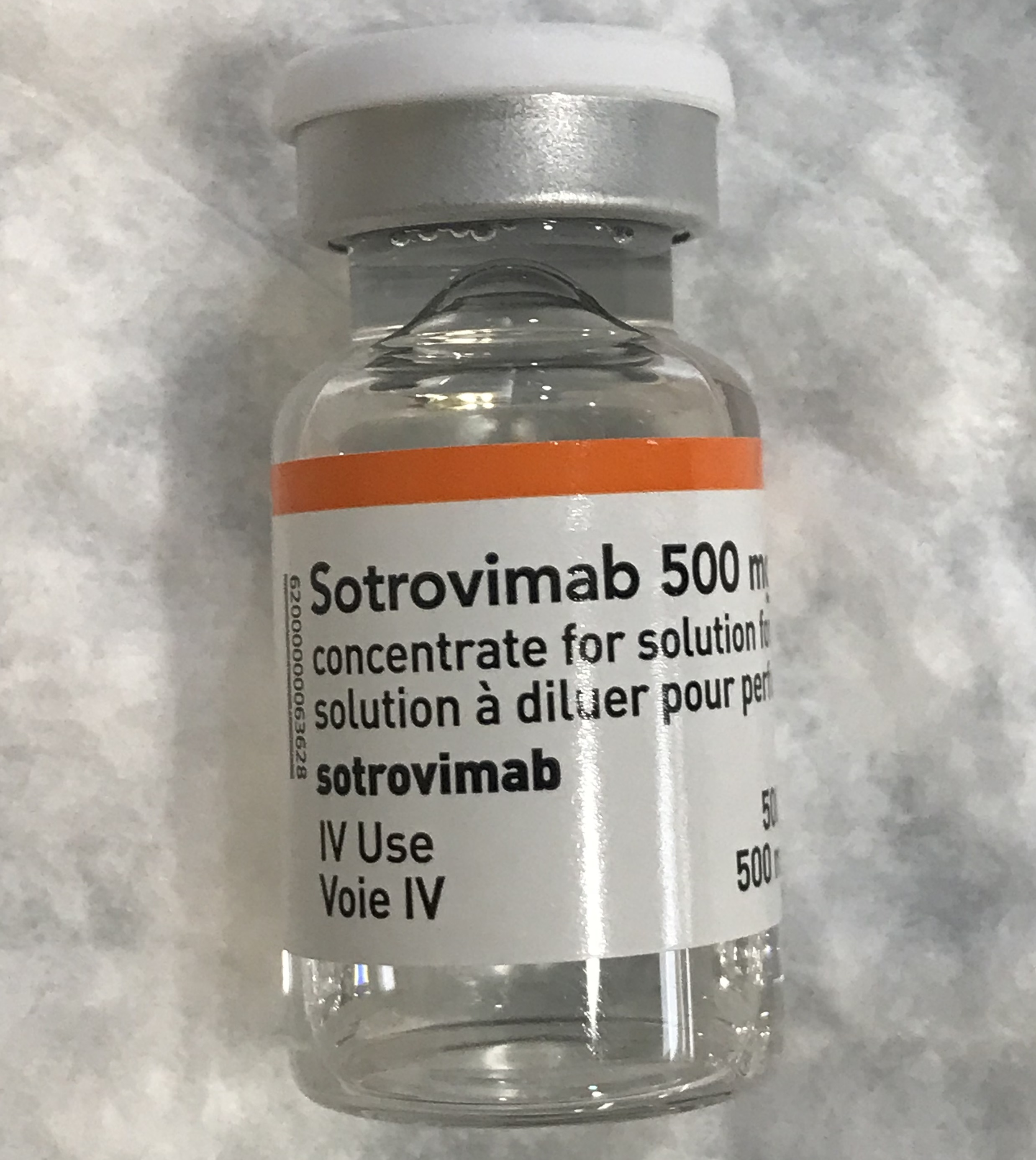
A vial of Sotrovimab

Sotrovimab, sold under the brand name Xevudy, is a human neutralizing monoclonal antibody with activity against severe acute respiratory syndrome coronavirus 2, known as SARS-CoV-2. It was developed by GlaxoSmithKline and Vir Biotechnology, Inc. Sotrovimab is designed to attach to the spike protein of SARS-CoV-2.

The most common side effects include hypersensitivity (allergic) reactions and infusion-related reactions.

Although Sotrovimab was used world-wide against SARS-CoV-2, including in the United States under an FDA emergency use authorization (EUA), the FDA canceled the EUA in April 2022 due to lack of efficacy against the Omicron variant.

== Medical uses ==
In the European Union, sotrovimab is indicated for the treatment of COVID-19 in people aged twelve years of age and older and weighing at least 40 kilograms (88 lb) who do not require supplemental oxygen and who are at increased risk of the disease becoming severe.

Sotrovimab is given by intravenous infusion, preferably within 5 days of onset of COVID-19 symptoms.

== Development and mechanism of action ==
Sotrovimab's development began in December 2019, at Vir Biotechnology when Vir scientists first learned of the initial COVID-19 outbreak in China. Vir subsidiary Humabs BioMed had already compiled a library of frozen blood samples from patients infected with viral diseases, including two samples from patients infected with SARS-CoV-1. Vir scientists obtained samples of the novel SARS-CoV-2 virus and mixed them with various antibodies recovered from the old SARS-CoV-1 blood samples. The objective was to identify antibodies effective against both SARS-CoV-1 and SARS-CoV-2. This would imply that the antibodies were targeting highly conserved sequences and in turn would be more likely to remain effective against future variants of SARS-CoV-2. In April 2020, Lawrence Berkeley National Laboratory conducted an X-ray crystallography study at Vir's request to investigate how such antibodies bind to SARS-CoV-2 at the molecular level. The Berkeley Lab data helped Vir identify candidates for further study, and Vir eventually settled on a single candidate antibody, S309. Vir collaborated with GlaxoSmithKline to make various refinements to S309, resulting in sotrovimab.

Sotrovimab has been engineered to possess an Fc LS mutation (M428L/N434S) that confers enhanced binding to the neonatal Fc receptor resulting in an extended half-life and potentially enhanced drug distribution to the lungs.

Sotrovimab has demonstrated activity via two antiviral mechanisms in vitro, antibody-dependent cellular cytotoxicity (ADCC) and antibody-dependent cellular phagocytosis (ADCP).

=== Clinical efficacy ===
The pivotal COMET-ICE study is an ongoing, randomized, double-blind, placebo-controlled study to assess the safety and efficacy of sotrovimab in adults with confirmed COVID-19 (mild, early disease with less than five days of symptoms) at risk of disease progression.

An interim analysis of this study reported that sotrovimab reduced the risk of hospitalization for more than 24 hours or death by 85% compared with placebo. Overall 1% of people receiving sotrovimab died or required hospitalization for more than 24 hours compared to 7% of people treated with placebo. The study is ongoing and preliminary results have been published in the New England Journal of Medicine.

The full analysis of the COMET-ICE trial was published in JAMA and it showed that sotrovimab reduced risk of hospitalization for more than 24 hours or death by 79% compared to placebo (1% for sotrovoimab group and 6% for the placebo group). The trial involved 1057 participants and took place before the omicron variant was prevalent.

== Manufacturing ==
Sotrovimab is a biologic product which takes six months to manufacture in living cells. It is produced in Chinese hamster ovary cells. At product launch in May 2021, sotrovimab's active pharmaceutical ingredient was produced by WuXi Biologics in China and sent to a GlaxoSmithKline plant in Parma, Italy for further processing into the finished product. In January 2022, the spread of the SARS-CoV-2 Omicron variant began to render other monoclonal antibodies obsolete and caused global demand for sotrovimab to skyrocket. In response, Vir and GlaxoSmithKline announced they were working with Samsung Biologics on manufacturing sotrovimab at an additional site in South Korea.

== Society and culture ==
=== Legal status ===
In May 2021, the Committee for Medicinal Products for Human Use (CHMP) of the European Medicines Agency (EMA) completed its review on the use of sotrovimab for the treatment of COVID-19. It concluded that sotrovimab can be used to treat confirmed COVID-19 in adults and adolescents (aged twelve years and above and weighing at least 40 kilograms (88 lb)) who do not require supplemental oxygen and who are at risk of progressing to severe COVID-19. In December 2021, sotrovimab was authorized for use in the EU.

In May 2021, the U.S. Food and Drug Administration (FDA) issued an emergency use authorization (EUA) for sotrovimab for the treatment of mild-to-moderate COVID-19 in people aged twelve years and above weighing at least 40 kilograms (88 lb) with positive results of direct SARS-CoV-2 viral testing and who are at high risk for progression to severe COVID-19, including hospitalization or death.

In August 2021, sotrovimab was granted provisional approval for the treatment of COVID-19 in Australia.

In September 2021, sotrovimab was granted special exception authorization in Japan.

In December 2021, the Medicines and Healthcare products Regulatory Agency (MHRA) in the United Kingdom approved sotrovimab for use in people aged twelve years of age and over who weigh more than 40 kilograms (88 lb).

In March 2022, the FDA withdrew the emergency use authorization for sotrovimab in multiple states due to the high frequency of the Omicron BA.2 sub-variant and data showing that the authorized dose of sotrovimab is unlikely to be effective against that sub-variant. In April 2022, the FDA withdrew the emergency use authorization for sotrovimab.

== Research ==
Sotrovimab is being evaluated in the following clinical trials:

- Clinical trial number NCT04545060 for "COMET-ICE" at ClinicalTrials.gov
- Clinical trial number NCT04779879 for "COMET-PEAK" at ClinicalTrials.gov
- Clinical trial number NCT04501978 for "ACTIV-3-TICO" at ClinicalTrials.gov
- Clinical trial number NCT04634409 for "BLAZE-4" at ClinicalTrials.gov

In March 2022, Australian virologists observed that sotrovimab may cause a drug-resistant mutation.
