= Bamlanivimab =

Experimental antibody treatment for COVID-19

Monoclonal antibody
- Type: Whole antibody
- Source: Human
- Target: Spike protein of SARS-CoV-2

Clinical data
- Pronunciation: /ˌbæmləˈnɪvɪmæb/ BAM-lə-NIV-i-mab
- Other names: LY-CoV555, LY3819253
- AHFS/Drugs.com: Monograph
- License data: US DailyMed: Bamlanivimab
- Routes of administration: Intravenous
- ATC code: None

Legal status
- Legal status: CA: ℞-only / Schedule D; US: ℞-only via emergency use authorization

Identifiers
- CAS Number: 2423943-37-5
- DrugBank: DB15718
- UNII: 45I6OFJ8QH
- KEGG: D11936

Bamlanivimab is a monoclonal antibody developed by AbCellera Biologics and Eli Lilly as a treatment for COVID-19. The medication was granted an emergency use authorization (EUA) by the US Food and Drug Administration (FDA) in November 2020, and the EUA was revoked in April 2021.

Bamlanivimab is an IgG1 monoclonal antibody (mAb) directed against the spike protein of SARS-CoV-2. The aim is to block viral attachment and entry into human cells, thus neutralizing the virus, and help preventing and treating COVID-19.

Bamlanivimab emerged from the collaboration between Lilly and AbCellera to create antibody therapies for the prevention and treatment of COVID-19.

Bamlanivimab is also used as part of the bamlanivimab/etesevimab combination that was granted an EUA by the FDA.

In June 2021, the US Office of the Assistant Secretary for Preparedness and Response (ASPR) paused distribution of bamlanivimab and etesevimab together, and etesevimab alone (to pair with existing supply of bamlanivimab), due to the increase of circulating variants.

== Studies ==
Bamlanivimab has been studied in several trials. Some initial results on bamlanivimab seemed promising, with one review saying that it "decrease[s] viral load when given early on in the course of SARS-CoV-2 infection and favourably impact[s] clinical outcomes for patients with mild-to-moderate COVID-19". However, further results have not shown any clinically relevant benefit.

=== Animal trials ===
An initial trial tested bamlanivimab in rhesus monkeys. Administration of the drug reduced SARS-CoV-2 replications in the upper and lower respiratory tract of monkeys.

=== Human trials ===
==== BLAZE-1 Trial ====
The Blocking Viral Attachment and Cell Entry with SARS-CoV-2 Neutralizing Antibodies (BLAZE-1) trial was sponsored by the drug's developer Eli Lilly. The drug was tested in SARS-CoV-2 patients who did not require hospitalization. While an interim analysis suggested reduced ER visits and hospitalizations, this difference was not statistically significant in the final analysis. A subsequent analysis demonstrated superior efficacy of a combination of bamlanivimab and etesevimab compared to placebo.

==== ACTIV-2 Trial ====
This study is sponsored by the NIH, examining bamlanivimab administration to SARS-CoV-2 patients in the outpatient setting. The study is ongoing and no data have been released yet.

==== ACTIV-3 Trial ====
This study specifically examined bamlanivimab in hospitalized COVID-19 patients without severe illness (e.g. end organ damage); these patients were also receiving the standard of care at the time including supportive care, remdesivir, supplemental oxygen, and dexamethasone as indicated. Enrollment was stopped early due to futility; bamlanivimab was not found to increase sustained recovery (90 days), and did not change pulmonary function. The study was funded by Operation Warp Speed.

== Authorization ==
On 7 October 2020, Eli Lilly and Company submitted a request for an Emergency Use Authorization (EUA) to the U.S. Food and Drug Administration (FDA) for LY-CoV555 monotherapy in higher-risk people who have been diagnosed with mild-to-moderate COVID-19. This authorization was largely done on the basis of the interim BLAZE-1 results showing possible benefit. However, further data obtained after the EUA was granted have not shown any clinically relevant benefit from bamlanivimab.

On 9 November 2020, bamlanivimab was granted an emergency use authorization by the US Food and Drug Administration (FDA) for the treatment of mild-to-moderate COVID-19 in adults and adolescents. Bamlanivimab is authorized for people with positive results of direct SARS-CoV-2 viral testing who are twelve years of age and older weighing at least 40 kilograms (88 lb), and who are at high risk for progressing to severe COVID-19 or hospitalization. This includes those who are 65 years of age or older, or who have certain chronic medical conditions.

On 16 April 2021, the FDA revoked the emergency use authorization (EUA) that allowed for the investigational monoclonal antibody therapy bamlanivimab, when administered alone, to be used for the treatment of mild-to-moderate COVID-19.

=== Bamlanivimab/etesevimab ===
On 9 February 2021, the FDA issued an emergency use authorization (EUA) for bamlanivimab and etesevimab administered together for the treatment of mild to moderate COVID-19 in people twelve years of age or older weighing at least 40 kilograms (88 lb) who test positive for SARS‑CoV‑2 and who are at high risk for progressing to severe COVID-19. The authorized use includes treatment for those who are 65 years of age or older or who have certain chronic medical conditions.

On 1 February 2021, the Committee for Medicinal Products for Human Use (CHMP) of the European Medicines Agency (EMA) started rolling reviews of data on the use of the monoclonal antibodies casirivimab/imdevimab, bamlanivimab/etesevimab, and bamlanivimab for the treatment of COVID-19. On 29 October 2021, Eli Lilly withdrew bamlanivimab and etesevimab from the European Medicines Agency rolling review process.

== Deployment ==
On 28 October 2020, Eli Lilly and Company announced that it had struck a deal with the US government to supply 300,000 vials of bamlanivimab 700 mg for US$375 million.

== Society and culture ==
=== Names ===
Bamlanivimab is the international nonproprietary name (INN).
