= Casirivimab/imdevimab =

Antiviral combination medication

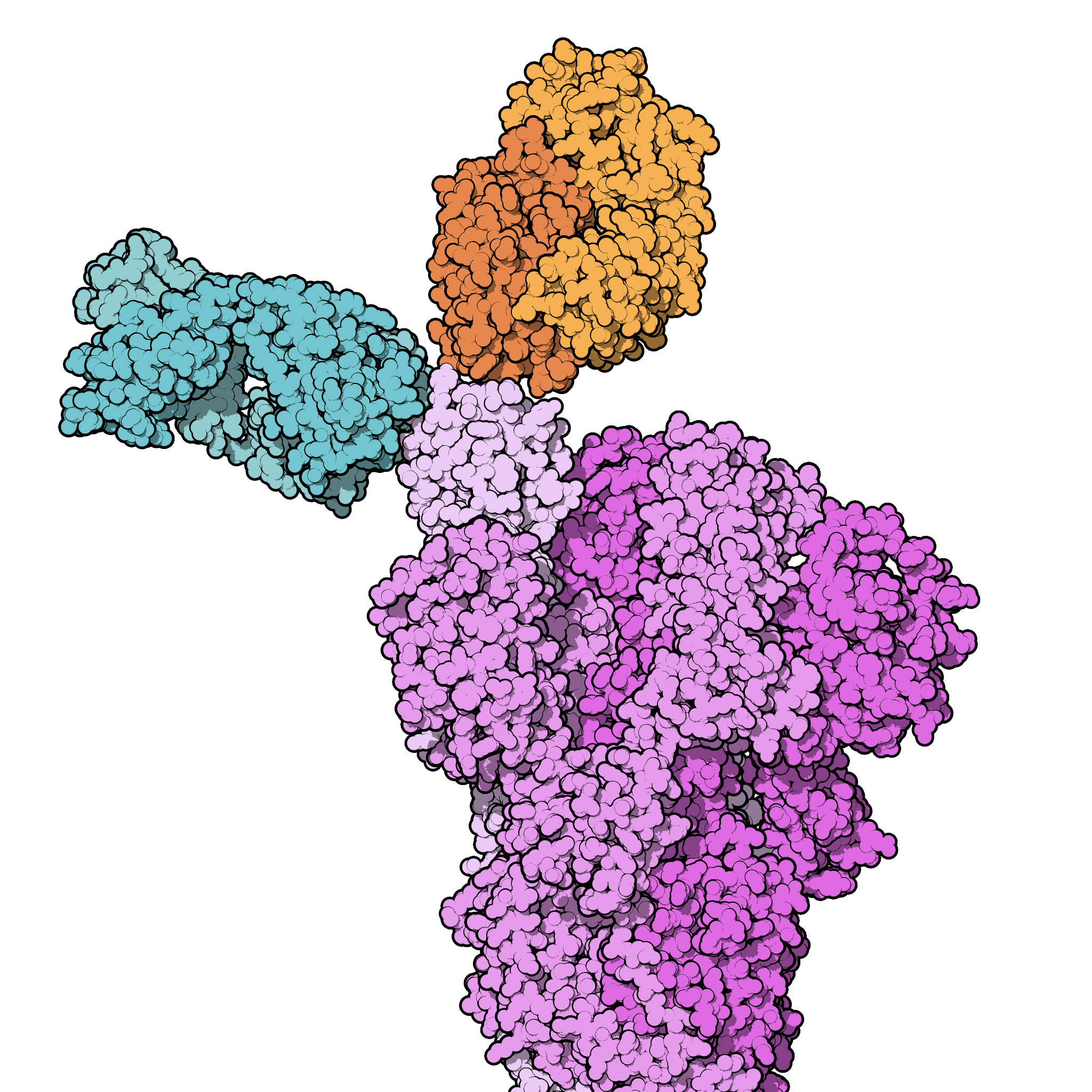
- REGN10933 (blue) and REGN10987 (orange) bound to SARS-CoV-2 spike protein (pink). From PDB: 6VSB, 6XDG.

Combination of
- Casirivimab: Monoclonal antibody against spike protein of SARS-CoV-2
- Imdevimab: Monoclonal antibody against spike protein of SARS-CoV-2

Clinical data
- Trade names: REGN-COV, Ronapreve
- AHFS/Drugs.com: Monograph
- MedlinePlus: a620063
- License data: US DailyMed: Casirivimab
- Pregnancy category: AU: B2
- Routes of administration: Intravenous, subcutaneous injection
- ATC code: J06BD07 (WHO)

Legal status
- Legal status: AU: S4 (Prescription only); CA: ℞-only / Schedule D; UK: POM (Prescription only); US: ℞-only via emergency use authorization; EU: Rx-only; Rx-only

Identifiers
- DrugBank: DB15691
- KEGG: D12142

Casirivimab
Monoclonal antibody
- Type: Whole antibody
- Source: Human
- Target: Spike protein of SARS-CoV-2

Clinical data
- Other names: REGN10933
- ATC code: None

Identifiers
- CAS Number: 2415933-42-3
- DrugBank: DB15941
- UNII: J0FI6WE1QN
- KEGG: D11938

Imdevimab
Monoclonal antibody
- Type: Whole antibody
- Source: Human
- Target: Spike protein of SARS-CoV-2

Clinical data
- Other names: REGN10987
- ATC code: None

Identifiers
- CAS Number: 2415933-40-1
- DrugBank: DB15940
- UNII: 2Z3DQD2JHM
- KEGG: D11939

Casirivimab/imdevimab, sold under the brand names REGEN‑COV and Ronapreve in various countries, is a combination medicine used for the treatment and prevention of COVID‑19. It consists of two human monoclonal antibodies, casirivimab and imdevimab that must be mixed together and administered as an infusion or subcutaneous injection. The combination of two antibodies is intended to prevent mutational escape. It is also available as a co-formulated product. It was developed by the American biotechnology company Regeneron Pharmaceuticals.

The most common side effects include allergic reactions, which include infusion related reactions, injection site reactions, brief pain, weakness and others.

On 13 December 2024, the U.S. Food and Drug Administration revised its authorizations for the use of REGEN-COV. Its authorized uses are for post-exposure prophylaxis (prevention) and for the treatment of COVID-19, with restrictions for age, weight, and other factors of clinical importance.

On 5 December 2025, the European Union withdrew its marketing authorisation for Ronapreve, because Roche had formally notified it of its decision to permanently discontinue the marketing of the product.

== Medical uses ==
In the European Union, the combination is indicated for the treatment of COVID‑19 in people aged twelve years of age and older weighing at least 40 kilograms (88 lb) who do not require supplemental oxygen and who are at high increased risk of progressing to severe COVID‑19; and for the prevention of COVID‑19 in people aged twelve years of age and older weighing at least 40 kilograms (88 lb).

== Deployment ==
REGEN‑COV is manufactured at the Regeneron's manufacturing facility in Rensselaer, New York. In September 2020, to free up manufacturing capacity for REGEN‑COV, Regeneron began to shift production of its existing products from Rensselaer to the Irish city of Limerick.

In August 2020, Regeneron Pharmaceuticals and Roche (Genentech) agreed to collaborate on the manufacture and future development of REGEN‑COV.

== Society and culture ==
On 2 October 2020, Regeneron Pharmaceuticals announced that then-US President Donald Trump had received "a single 8 gram dose of REGN-COV2" after testing positive for SARS-CoV-2. The drug was provided by the company in response to a "compassionate use" (temporary authorization for use) request from the president's physicians.

In August 2021, Texas Governor Greg Abbott received REGEN‑COV after testing positive for COVID‑19.

=== Economics ===
In January 2021, the United States agreed to purchase 1.25 million doses of the drug for $2.625 billion, at $2,100 per dose. On 14 September, another 1.4 million doses were purchased for the same price, totaling $2.94 billion.

In January 2021, the German government purchased 200,000 doses for €400 million at €2,000 per dose.

In May 2021, Roche India and Cipla announced that the medicine would be available in India for Rs 59,750 ($808.31) per dose.

In September 2021, the World Health Organization urged producers and governments to address the drug's high cost and called for technology sharing to enable the manufacture of biosimilar versions. The WHO also said that Unitaid is negotiating with Roche for lower prices and equitable distribution, especially in low- and middle income countries.

=== Trademarks ===
In September 2021, the U.S. Patent and Trademark Office accepted Regeneron Pharmaceuticals' application for a trademark on REGEN-COV in goods and services class IC005 ("Pharmaceutical preparations for treatment or prevention of COVID-19...").

In November 2021, the Committee for Medicinal Products for Human Use (CHMP) of the European Medicines Agency (EMA) recommended granting a marketing authorization in the European Union for casirivimab/imdevimab (Ronapreve) for the treatment and prevention of COVID‑19. The company that applied for authorization of Ronapreve is Roche Registration GmbH.

== Regulatory Actions ==
On 21 November 2020, in response to a request by Regeneron Pharmaceuticals, the U.S. Food and Drug Administration (FDA) issued an emergency use authorization (EUA) for casirivimab and imdevimab to be administered together for the treatment of mild to moderate [COVID‑19] in people twelve years of age or older weighing at least 40 kilograms (88 lb) with positive results of direct SARS-CoV-2 viral testing and who are at high risk for progressing to severe COVID‑19.

In February 2021, the Committee for Medicinal Products for Human Use (CHMP) of the European Medicines Agency (EMA) started a rolling review of data on the REGN‑COV2 antibody combination (casirivimab/imdevimab), which is being co-developed by Regeneron Pharmaceuticals, Inc. and F. Hoffman-La Roche, Ltd (Roche) for the treatment and prevention of COVID‑19. In February 2021, the CHMP concluded that the combination, also known as REGN-COV2, can be used for the treatment of confirmed COVID‑19 in people who do not require supplemental oxygen and who are at high risk of progressing to severe COVID‑19.

The Central Drugs Standards Control Organisation (CDSCO) in India, on 5 May 2021, granted an Emergency Use Authorization to Roche (Genentech) and Regeneron for use of the casirivimab/imdevimab cocktail in the country. The announcement came in light of the second wave of the COVID‑19 pandemic in India. Roche India maintains partnership with Cipla, thereby permitting the latter to market the drug in the country.

In January 2022, the U.S. Food and Drug Administration revised the authorizations for two monoclonal antibody treatments – bamlanivimab/etesevimab (administered together) and casirivimab/imdevimab – to limit their use to only when the recipients are likely to have been infected with or exposed to a variant that is susceptible to these treatments because data show these treatments are highly unlikely to be active against the omicron variant.

On 13 December 2024, the U.S. EUA for REGEN‑COV was revoked. Its use remains authorized in the U.S. for post-exposure prophylaxis (prevention) and treatment of COVID-19, with restrictions for age, weight, and other factors of clinical importance.

== Trials ==
The U.S. Food and Drug Administration's 2020 emergency use authorization (EUA) for casirivimab and imdevimab was based on the results of a randomized, double-blind, placebo-controlled clinical trial of 799 non-hospitalized adults with mild to moderate COVID‑19 symptoms.

In April 2021, Roche (Genentech) and Regeneron announced that the Phase III clinical trial REGN-COV 2069 met both primary and secondary endpoints, reducing risk of infection by 81% for the non-infected participants, and reducing time-to-resolution of symptoms for symptomatic participants to one week vs. three weeks in the placebo group.

A clinical trial of 9785 people who were admitted to hospital in the U.K. with COVID‑19 between September 2020 and May 2021, found that casirivimab and imdevimab, administered together, reduced mortality by one-fifth among the (large) fraction of the patients in this study who were not already producing COVID-19 antibodies. No deaths or serious adverse reactions were attributed to the treatment.

In January 2024, clinical observations were published recording the full remission on long COVID symptoms in three patients who were treated with casirivimab/imdevimab. The authors call for targeted research into the possibility that monoclonal antibody (MCA) infusions, such as casirivimab/imdevimab, may be efficacious in treating post-viral chronic conditions and long COVID from variants other than the (pre-Delta) COVID-19 acute infections of these case histories.
