= Bamlanivimab/etesevimab =

Monoclonal antibody combination treatment for COVID-19

Combination of
- Bamlanivimab: Monoclonal antibody
- Etesevimab: Monoclonal antibody

Clinical data
- License data: US DailyMed: Bamlanivimab
- Routes of administration: Intravenous
- ATC code: None

Legal status
- Legal status: US: ℞-only via emergency use authorization

Bamlanivimab/etesevimab is a combination of two monoclonal antibodies, bamlanivimab and etesevimab, administered together via intravenous infusion as a treatment for COVID-19. Both types of antibody target the surface spike protein of SARS‑CoV‑2.

Bamlanivimab and etesevimab, administered together, are authorized in the United States for the treatment of mild-to-moderate COVID-19 in people aged twelve years of age and older weighing at least 40 kilograms (88 lb) with positive results of direct SARS-CoV-2 viral testing, and who are at high risk for progression to severe COVID-19, including hospitalization or death. They are also authorized, when administered together, for use after exposure to the SARS-CoV-2 virus for post-exposure prophylaxis (PEP) for COVID-19 and are not authorized for pre-exposure prophylaxis to prevent COVID-19 before being exposed to the SARS-CoV-2 virus.

In January 2022, the U.S. Food and Drug Administration (FDA) revised the authorizations for two monoclonal antibody treatments – bamlanivimab/etesevimab (administered together) and casirivimab/imdevimab – to limit their use to only when the recipients are likely to have been infected with or exposed to a variant that is susceptible to these treatments. Because data show these treatments are highly unlikely to be active against the omicron variant, which is circulating at a very high frequency throughout the United States, these treatments are not authorized for use in any U.S. states, territories, and jurisdictions at this time.

== Contents ==
=== Etesevimab ===
Etesevimab
Monoclonal antibody
- Type: Whole antibody
- Source: Human
- Target: Spike protein of SARS-CoV-2

Clinical data
- Other names: LY3832479, LY-CoV016
- License data: US DailyMed: Etesevimab
- Routes of administration: Intravenous
- ATC code: None

Identifiers
- CAS Number: 2423948-94-9
- DrugBank: DB15897
- UNII: N7Q9NLF11I
- KEGG: D11944

Etesevimab is a monoclonal antibody against the surface spike protein of SARS‑CoV‑2.

Eli Lilly licensed etesevimab from Junshi Biosciences.

=== Bamlanivimab ===
Bamlanivimab is an IgG1 monoclonal antibody (mAb) directed against the spike protein of SARS‑CoV‑2. The aim is to block viral attachment and entry into human cells, thus neutralizing the virus, and help preventing and treating COVID-19.

== Trials ==
The data supporting the emergency use authorization (EUA) for bamlanivimab and etesevimab are based on a randomized, double-blind, placebo-controlled clinical trial in 1,035 non-hospitalized participants with mild to moderate COVID-19 symptoms who were at high risk for progressing to severe COVID-19. Of these participants, 518 received a single infusion of bamlanivimab 2,800 milligrams and etesevimab 2,800 milligrams together, and 517 received placebo. The primary endpoint was COVID-19 related hospitalizations or death by any cause during 29 days of follow-up. Hospitalization or death occurred in 36 (7%) participants who received placebo compared to 11 (2%) participants treated with bamlanivimab 2,800 milligrams and etesevimab 2,800 milligrams administered together, a 70% reduction. All ten deaths (2%) occurred in the placebo group. Thus, all-cause death was significantly lower in the bamlanivimab 2,800-milligram and etesevimab 2,800-milligram group than the placebo group.

== Economics ==
In February 2021, the United States government agreed to purchase 100,000 doses of the drug for $210 million, at $2,100 per dose.

== Research ==
=== COVID-19 ===
In February 2021, the FDA issued an emergency use authorization (EUA) for bamlanivimab and etesevimab administered together for the treatment of mild to moderate COVID-19 in people twelve years of age or older weighing at least 40 kilograms (88 lb) who test positive for SARS‑CoV‑2 and who are at high risk for progressing to severe COVID-19. The authorized use includes treatment for those who are 65 years of age or older or who have certain chronic medical conditions. While bamlanivimab and etesevimab administered together resulted in a lower risk of resistant viruses developing during treatment compared with bamlanivimab administered alone, both treatments are available under an EUA and are expected to benefit people at high risk of disease progression. On 16 April 2021, the FDA revoked the emergency use authorization (EUA) that allowed for the investigational monoclonal antibody therapy bamlanivimab, when administered alone, to be used for the treatment of mild-to-moderate COVID-19 in adults and certain pediatric patients. The EUA was issued to Eli Lilly and Co.

In February 2021, the Committee for Medicinal Products for Human Use (CHMP) of the European Medicines Agency (EMA) started rolling reviews of data on the use of the monoclonal antibodies casirivimab/imdevimab, bamlanivimab/etesevimab, and bamlanivimab for the treatment of COVID-19. In March 2021, the CHMP concluded that bamlanivimab and etesevimab can be used together to treat confirmed COVID-19 in people who do not require supplemental oxygen and who are at high risk of their COVID-19 disease becoming severe. The CHMP also looked at the use of bamlanivimab alone and concluded that, despite uncertainties around the benefits of monotherapy, it can be considered a treatment option. In October 2021, the CHMP ended the rolling review of bamlanivimab/etesevimab.
