= Emergency Use Authorization =

Granted by the Food and Drug Administration in the US

An Emergency Use Authorization (EUA) in the United States is an authorization granted to the Food and Drug Administration (FDA) under sections of the Federal Food, Drug, and Cosmetic Act as added to and amended by various Acts of Congress, including by the Pandemic and All-Hazards Preparedness Reauthorization Act of 2013 (PAHPRA), as codified by 21 U.S.C. § 360bbb-3, to allow the use of a drug prior to approval. It does not constitute approval of the drug in the full statutory meaning of the term, but instead authorizes the FDA to facilitate availability of an unapproved product, or an unapproved use of an approved product, during a declared state of emergency from one of several agencies or of a "material threat" by the secretary of homeland security.

== Use ==
EUAs have historically been infrequent. A review article by Rizk et al. provides a summary of the US experience in 2020 with pharmacological EUA approvals during the COVID-19 pandemic. It also provides a description of, and clinical rationale for, the EUA-approved drugs during the pandemic and concluding reflections on the EUA program and its potential future uses.

After initial authorizations for serious diseases such as pandemic influenza and emerging diseases, EUAs were also authorized for medical countermeasures principally in response to public health emergencies such as bioterrorism, including chemical, biological, radiological, and nuclear (CBRN) threats. Subsequent legislative authorities expanded the class of drugs eligible for consideration, and the range of testing to which the drug or therapy has been subjected. The scope and applicability of EUAs is also affected by presidential executive orders (Title 3 of the Code of Federal Regulations), which may affect the definition of the situations considered to be public health emergencies, and under which the authority of the FDA to issue EUAs may be exercised.

Consideration of a drug for an EUA requires a finding that it is "reasonable to believe" that the drug "may be effective" "to prevent, diagnose, or treat serious or life-threatening diseases or conditions that can be caused by a [chemical, biological, radiological, and nuclear] agent(s)" or to mitigate a disease or condition caused by an FDA-regulated product ... used to diagnose, treat, or prevent a disease or condition caused by" such an agent.

The "may be effective" standard for EUAs provides for a lower level of evidence than the "effectiveness" standard that the FDA uses for product approvals, using a risk-benefit analysis based on "the totality of the scientific evidence available", it is "reasonable to believe" that the product may be effective for the specified use.

EUAs end once the secretary of health and human services determines that the precipitating emergency has ended (in consultation with the issuer of the appropriate state of emergency as necessary), or once the product or unapproved use is approved through normal channels.

== History of legal authority for EUAs ==
In the United States, EUAs are authorized by Section 564 of the Federal Food Drug and Cosmetic Act (FDCA) of 1938 (Public Law 75-717) as added and subsequently amended by the Project BioShield Act of 2004 (S. 15, Public Law 108–276) for funding of the development and procurement of medical countermeasures against CBRN threats, the Pandemic and All-Hazards Preparedness Reauthorization Act of 2013 (H.R. 307, Pub. L. 113–5 (text) (PDF)), the 21st Century Cures Act of 2016 (H.R. 34, Public Law 114–255) and Pub. L. 115–92 (text) (PDF) of 2017 (no short title).

== Applicability and the animal efficacy rule ==
EUAs may be applied to drugs, devices or biological product. EUAs may permit the emergency use of an unapproved drug, device or biologic product, or permit an unapproved use of an approved drug, device or biologic product. Furthermore, drugs, devices or biologic products may or may not have undergone human efficacy trials, due to risk, feasibility or ethical considerations. Drugs, devices or biologic products which have only been tested or approved under the animal efficacy rule are loosely known as animal products. Under certain conditions, an EUA may authorize the emergency use in humans, of drugs, devices or biologic products approved under the animal efficacy rule. EUAs may also only be implemented during the period of a public health emergency as defined by a declaration of the secretary of health and human services. Conditions determining the applicability of such declarations may be specified by federal statute. Code of Federal Regulations or an presidential executive order (Title 3 of the Code of Federal Regulations).

== Use during pandemics ==
In response to requests from the U.S. Centers for Disease Control and Prevention (CDC), on April 27, 2009, the FDA issued Emergency Use Authorizations to make available diagnostic and therapeutic tools to identify and respond to the 2009 swine flu pandemic under certain circumstances. The agency issued these EUAs for the use of certain powerful antiviral drugs, and for the quantitative PCR swine flu test.

On February 4, 2020, in response to the COVID-19 pandemic, the secretary of health and human services declared the public health emergency for the novel SARS-CoV-2 virus, which causes the disease COVID-19, for deployment of the FDA EUA for certain medical devices involved in the diagnosis of COVID-19. In February 2020, The FDA issued an EUA for COVID-19 testing CDC test kits for COVID-19. In 2020, the FDA issued EUAs for remdesivir, convalescent plasma, Fresenius Propoven 2% emulsion (propofol), hydroxychloroquine (revoked, although its license for established indications remains), and bamlanivimab – all in response to the COVID-19 pandemic. On April 16, 2021, the FDA revoked the emergency use authorization (EUA) that allowed for the investigational monoclonal antibody therapy bamlanivimab, when administered alone, to be used for the treatment of mild-to-moderate COVID-19 in adults and certain pediatric patients.

In December 2020, the Center for Biologics Evaluation and Research's Vaccines and Related Biological Products Advisory Committee (VRBPAC) voted to recommend EUA for the Pfizer–BioNTech COVID-19 vaccine. The vaccine had received emergency authorization in the United Kingdom earlier in the month, but according to European Union officials, this was only for certain batches of the vaccine. In the U.S., the VRBPAC supported an EUA for Moderna's mRNA vaccine, mRNA-1273.

== See also ==
- World Health Organization (WHO)
- European Medicines Agency (EMA)
- Pan American Health Organization (PAHO)
