= Mandeep R. Mehra =

American professor of medicine

Mandeep Rajinder Mehra
- Born: 3 December 1967 (age 58); Delhi, India
- Occupations: Professor at Harvard Medical School; Medical Director of Brigham Heart and Vascular Center

Mandeep R. Mehra (born December 1967 in Delhi) is The William Harvey Distinguished Chair in Advanced Cardiovascular Medicine and a professor of medicine at Harvard Medical School. He is the medical director of the Brigham Heart and Vascular Center in Boston, Massachusetts, and specializes in advanced heart failure, mechanical circulatory support and cardiac transplantation.

He has served as president of the International Society for Heart and Lung Transplantation (ISHLT) and is the editor-in-chief of the society's journal, the Journal of Heart and Lung Transplantation. He was also president of the Heart Failure Society of America.

== Early life and career ==
Mandeep Rajinder Mehra was born in December 1967. After graduating in medicine from the Mahatma Gandhi Institute of Medical Sciences in 1993, he pursued further studies in the United States with the ambition to qualify in cardiac catheterization.

== Cardiology career ==
Narrowing of the coronary arteries, or cardiac allograft vasculopathy (CAV), after a heart transplant has been noted as a significant problem in terms of long-term survival. The terminology used in past research has varied, causing difficulties in interpreting which treatments benefit. In 2010, Mehra led the first international consensus document from the ISHLT working group on the classification of CAV, standardising the nomenclature used and therefore defining the best way to identify CAV. His paper on allograft vasculopathy was accepted for presentation at the ISHLT in Venice.

His research focuses on the use of intravascular ultrasound and angioscopy in coronary artery disease after heart transplantation. In addition, he has interests in new immunosuppressive therapy in minority populations and the role of artificial hearts and bio-markers to assess diagnosis and treatment in heart failure. Other research pursuits have included reducing side-effects of endomyocardial biopsies using genomic and proteomic markers. He was also the first to define the association of suppressed natriuretic peptide expression in obesity.

In 2018, Mehra published results of his research on the benefits of some left ventricular assist devices.

== Surgisphere scandal ==
On May 1, 2020, Mehra was the lead author of a small group who published results of an analysis of data from 169 hospitals collected via a database funded by Surgisphere to assess the risk of in-hospital death among patients with cardiovascular disease infected with SARS-CoV2 in the New England Journal of Medicine. On May 22, 2020, the same group published another analysis of the Surgisphere data in The Lancet describing outcomes in patients treated with hydroxychloroquine with or without a macrolide for patients with COVID-19. The latter paper resulted in the World Health Organization Director-General Tedros Adhanom Ghebreyesus announcing the temporary halt of hydroxychloroquine arm of its Solidarity Trial of therapies for COVID-19. The provenance and validity of the data and database on which both papers rely was questioned, and an expression of concern was published in The Lancet and in the NEJM. Mehra, Ruschitzka, and Patel quickly hired an independent company to conduct an audit of the Surgisphere data. On June 4, Mehra and two of his co-authors retracted The Lancet paper that had raised caution about the safety of hydroxychloroquine, due to inability to gain access to the data in the audit. "We can no longer vouch for the veracity of the primary data sources," Mehra and his co-authors wrote.

As the NEJM study used data from Surgisphere, the authors also withdrew that study. In the meantime, the same authors pulled a pre-print publication claiming effectiveness of ivermectin, an anthelmintic, in treating coronavirus from the pre-print server, as this paper also relied on the same Surgisphere data source. However, the study had already led to Peru, Bolivia, Paraguay, Colombia and Chile using the drug for COVID-19 treatment. Mehra apologised for rushing to publish during the COVID-19 crisis: "I did not do enough to ensure that the data source was appropriate for this use. For that, and for all the disruptions—both directly and indirectly—I am truly sorry." Dr. Richard Horton, editor in chief of The Lancet, called the paper a fabrication and "a monumental fraud". Dr. Eric Rubin, editor in chief of NEJM, said "We shouldn’t have published this".

Mehra was introduced to Surgisphere founder Sapan Desai by colleague Amit Patel. It was later found that Desai and Patel were brothers-in-law, and that Patel's position at the University of Utah was terminated.

== Appointments ==
He became the William Harvey Distinguished Chair in Advanced Cardiovascular Medicine and a professor of medicine at Harvard Medical School and medical director of the Brigham Heart and Vascular Center in Boston, Massachusetts. He specializes in advanced heart failure, mechanical circulatory support and cardiac transplantation.

Mehra served as president of the ISHLT in 2008-2009 and became editor-in-chief of the society's journal, the Journal of Heart and Lung Transplantation.

In 2016, he was appointed president of the Heart Failure Society of America.

== Selected publications ==
He has published more than 500 manuscripts, abstracts, and book chapters in areas of immunosuppression, genomic medicine, cardiac transplant rejection, guidelines for listing patients for a heart transplant, and in mechanical circulatory support.

== Papers ==
- Mehra, M. R. (June 2006). "Contemporary Concepts in Prevention and Treatment of Cardiac Allograft Vasculopathy". American Journal of Transplantation. 6 (6): 1248–1256. doi:10.1111/j.1600-6143.2006.01314.x. PMID 16686747. S2CID 22840034.
- Mehra, Mandeep R.; Salerno, Christopher; Cleveland, Joseph C.; Pinney, Sean; Yuzefpolskaya, Melana; Milano, Carmelo A.; Itoh, Akinobu; Goldstein, Daniel J.; Uriel, Nir; Gulati, Sanjeev; Pagani, Francis D.; John, Ranjit; Adamson, Robert; Bogaev, Roberta; Thohan, Vinay; Chuang, Joyce; Sood, Poornima; Goates, Scott; Silvestry, Scott C. (30 October 2018). "Healthcare Resource Use and Cost Implications in the MOMENTUM 3 Long-Term Outcome Study: Randomized Controlled Trial of a Magnetically Levitated Cardiac Pump in Advanced Heart Failure". Circulation. 138 (18): 1923–1934. doi:10.1161/CIRCULATIONAHA.118.035722. PMID 29807933. S2CID 44098922.

=== Books ===
- Current Advances in Heart Transplantation: An Issue of Heart Failure Clinics, Elsevier (2007), ISBN 978-1416043201.
- History of International Heart and Lung Transplantation, co-authored with James K. Kirklin and Lori J. West, Elsevier (2010).
- Clinical Challenges in Heart Failure, Clinical Pub Serv (2010), ISBN 9781846920448.
- Emergency Cardiac Care 2012: From the ED to the CCU, An Issue of Cardiology Clinics, co-authored with Amal Mattu, Elsevier Health Sciences (2012), ISBN 9781455748914.
- Oxford Textbook of Advanced Heart Failure and Cardiac Transplantation, co-authored with Michael J. Domanski and Marc A. Pfeffer, Oxford University Press (2016), (ISBN 978-0-19-873487-1.

=== Chapters ===
- Chapter 12, "Management of Hypertension in Left Ventricular Systolic Dysfunction", co-authored with F. Siddiqi, and K. Thanavaro in Evidence-based Management of Hypertension, edited by Matthew R Weir, Gutenberg Press (2010), ISBN 9781908986542.
