= Association of American Physicians and Surgeons =

Conservative political advocacy organization

- Founded: 1943
- Type: Political advocacy group
- Tax ID no.: 36-2059197
- Legal status: 501(c)(6)
- Purpose: Opposition to abortion, Medicare and Medicaid, universal health care, and government involvement in health care
- Headquarters: Tucson, Arizona, United States
- Members: ~5,000
- President: Paul Martin Kempin
- Executive director: Jane M. Orient
- Revenue: $642,740 (2019)
- Expenses: $724,976 (2019)
- Website: aapsonline.org

The Association of American Physicians and Surgeons (AAPS) is a politically conservative non-profit association that promotes conspiracy theories and medical misinformation, such as HIV/AIDS denialism, climate change denial, the abortion–breast cancer hypothesis, and vaccine and autism connections, through its official publication, the Journal of American Physicians and Surgeons, that masquerades as a legitimate scientific journal. The association was founded in 1943 to oppose a government attempt to nationalize health care. The group has included notable members, including American Republican politicians Ron Paul, Rand Paul and Tom Price.

== History ==
During the winter of 1943, the medical committee of Lake County, Indiana, and the conservative National Physicians Committee opposed the newly proposed Wagner-Murray-Dingell Bill, that if passed, would provide government health care for most U.S. citizens. The American Medical Association (AMA) had just been convicted, in the Supreme Court, of conspiring to violate the Sherman Antitrust Act, which meant the AMA's legislation influence was hamstrung. The association began a membership drive in February 1944. By May 1944, the AAPS claimed members from all 48 states. In 1944, Time reported that the group's aim was the "defeat of any Government group medicine."

In 1966, The New York Times described AAPS as an "ultra-right-wing ... political-economic rather than a medical group", and said some of its leaders were members of the John Birch Society. On October 6, 1978, Ronald Reagan gave an address at the 35th annual meeting of AAPS in Denver, Colorado where he said "Government is not the answer. Government is the problem."

In 2002, AAPS said that its members included Ron Paul, John Cooksey and Paul Broun. Ron Paul's son, Rand Paul, was a member for over two decades until his election to the U.S. Senate. They reportedly had about 4,000 members in 2005, and 5,000 in 2014.

The executive director is Jane Orient, an internist and a member of the Oregon Institute of Science and Medicine. She is also a supporter and political donor to conservative interest group Eagle Forum. She has said that government vaccine mandates are "a serious intrusion into individual liberty, autonomy and parental decisions."

== Political positions ==
AAPS is generally recognized as politically conservative or ultra-conservative, and its positions are fringe and commonly contradict existing federal health policy. It is opposed to the Affordable Care Act and other forms of universal health insurance.

The Washington Post summarized their beliefs in February 2017 as "doctors should be autonomous in treating their patients — with far fewer government rules, medical quality standards, insurance coverage limits and legal penalties when they make mistakes". The organization requires its members to sign a "declaration of independence" pledging that they will not work with Medicare, Medicaid, or private insurance companies.

During the 2020 presidential election, the group's president, Marilyn Singleton, donated the maximum amount allowed by the Federal Election Commission to the Donald Trump 2020 presidential campaign.

The group's political action committee has donated exclusively to the Republican Party in each election cycle since 1994.

=== Abortion ===
AAPS opposes abortion and emergency contraception.

=== Gun control ===
The AAPS opposes gun control and does not recognize handgun violence as a public health problem. Instead, the AAPS says that handguns save lives, and that gun research sponsored by the Centers for Disease Control and Prevention (CDC) is politically motivated "junk science".

=== Social Security ===
In a 1954 Senate Finance Committee hearing, then president-elect of AAPS, James L. Doenges, said that social security was un-American and part of a "socialistic scheme" to destroy liberty.

"Contrary to some thinking, social security is not a permanent part of the American way of life. It is foreign-spawned and nurtured, the parent of socialism, and one of every socialistic scheme for obtaining and keeping control of the citizenry by destroying individual liberty."

AAPS opposed the Social Security Act of 1965 which established Medicare and Medicaid, encouraging member physicians to boycott Medicare and Medicaid. They went to court to block enforcement of a Social Security amendment that would monitor the treatment given to Medicare and Medicaid patients; in November 1975 the Supreme Court let stand a lower-court decision upholding the Social Security legislation.

=== Opposition to health-care reform ===
With several other groups, AAPS filed a lawsuit in 1993 against Hillary Clinton and Secretary of Health and Human Services Donna Shalala over closed-door meetings related to the 1993 Clinton health care plan. The AAPS sued to gain access to the list of members of President Bill Clinton's health care task force. Judge Royce C. Lamberth initially found in favor of the plaintiffs and awarded $285,864 to the AAPS for legal costs; Lamberth also harshly criticized the Clinton administration and Clinton aide Ira Magaziner in his ruling. Subsequently, a federal appeals court overturned the award and the initial findings on the basis that Magaziner and the administration had not acted in bad faith.

The AAPS was involved in litigation in 2001 against the Health Insurance Portability and Accountability Act (HIPAA), arguing that it violated the Fourth Amendment by allowing government access to certain medical data without a warrant. (Title II of HIPAA, known as the Administrative Simplification (AS) provisions, requires the establishment of national standards for electronic health care transactions and national identifiers for providers, health insurance plans, and employers, and is intended to improve the efficiency and effectiveness of the US's health care system by encouraging the widespread use of electronic data interchange in the health care system.)

The AAPS campaigned against President Barack Obama's Patient Protection and Affordable Care Act (Obamacare). An AAPS lawsuit opposing the act, and seeking to invalidate it, was dismissed in March 2014 for lack of standing and failure to state a valid cause of action. Andrew Schlafly, a Christian conservative activist, was general counsel to the AAPS, and the lead counsel in the effort to bring the lawsuit before the United States Supreme Court.

=== Scope of practice ===
The group is opposed to increasing access to healthcare through expanded scope of practice. In 2020, AAPS worked with the California Medical Association to oppose California Assembly Bill 890, which aimed to increase the number of primary care providers in the state. The bill was proposed by Jim Wood, a Democratic member of the California State Assembly.

In March 2021, the group supported Physicians for Patient Protection and the Texas Medical Association in their opposition to Texas House Bill 2029, which was written to address the medical workforce shortage and improve public access to healthcare. The bill was proposed by Stephanie Klick, a Republican member of the Texas House of Representatives.

=== Other cases ===
In 2007, AAPS assisted in the appeal against the conviction of Virginia internist William Hurwitz, who was sentenced to 25 years in federal prison for prescribing excessive quantities of narcotic drugs after 16 former patients testified against him. Hurwitz was granted a retrial in 2006, and his 25-year prison sentence was reduced to 4 years and 9 months.

In July 2019, AAPS co-signed a letter to the Surgeon General of the United States Jerome Adams with the anti-LGBT group American College of Pediatricians, the Catholic Medical Association, and the pro conversion therapy group the Alliance for Therapeutic Choice and Scientific Integrity. The letter asked Adams to not support affirming care for gender dysphoric children. The letter claimed that health professionals who don't provide care for gender dysphoria were at risk of discrimination.

== Controversies ==
=== COVID-19 and hydroxychloroquine ===
Hydroxychloroquine was an early failed experimental treatment for COVID-19. It is not effective for preventing infection. Several countries initially used chloroquine or hydroxychloroquine for treatment of persons hospitalized with COVID-19, and from April to June 2020, there was an emergency use authorization (EUA) for its use in the United States, and was used off label for potential treatment of the disease. On 24 April 2020, citing the risk of "serious heart rhythm problems", the FDA posted a caution against using the drug for COVID-19 "outside of the hospital setting or a clinical trial".

In June, hydroxychloroquine proved to have no benefit for hospitalized patients with severe COVID-19 illness in the international Solidarity trial and UK RECOVERY Trial. On 15 June, the FDA revoked a previously granted EUA, stating that it was "no longer reasonable to believe" that the drug was effective against COVID-19 or that its benefits outweighed "known and potential risks".

In the same month, AAPS filed a lawsuit against the Food and Drug Administration to "end its arbitrary interference with the use of hydroxychloroquine (HCQ)." The group's position was used to justify President Donald Trump taking HCQ as protection against COVID-19 by his campaign manager Brad Parscale. Several AAPS members and supporters went on the record advocating for HCQ as an effective treatment against COVID-19, led by Ukrainian-American physician Vladimir Zelenko with a three-drug regimen of off-label hydroxychloroquine, zinc, and Azithromycin as part of an experimental outpatient treatment for COVID-19 that became known as the Zelenko Protocol. Early in the pandemic, the experimental treatment had received broad recognition from Sean Hannity, Rudy Giuliani, and Mark Meadows, elevating Zelenko to minor celebrity status in conservative political circles. Other prominent AAPS-affiliated advocates include Simone Gold of America's Frontline Doctors, Niran Al-Agba of Physicians for Patient Protection, and former AAPS president Marilyn Singleton.

=== Electronic medical records ===
AAPS has claimed that computers and the digitization of medical records provides an opportunity for the government to acquire massive amounts of private data on American citizens. The group's executive director, Jane Orient, submitted their official statement to the Centers for Disease Control and Prevention's National Committee on Vital and Health Statistics on December 8, 1998. The statement said the benefits of computerized patient records were "based on assumptions that are implausible" and would "violate constitutional rights." AAPS compared electronic medical records to the data surveillance methods of the East German Stasi.

=== Rush Limbaugh drug charges ===
In 2004, AAPS filed a brief on behalf of conservative talk show host Rush Limbaugh in Florida's Fourth District Court of Appeal, opposing the seizure of his medical files in an investigation of drug charges for Limbaugh's alleged misuse of prescription drugs. The AAPS stated the seizure was a violation of state law and that "It is not a crime for a patient to be in pain and repeatedly seek relief, and doctors should not be turned against patients they tried to help."

=== Tobacco ===
Philip Morris executives worked with AAPS executive director Jane Orient to help oppose growing support for indoor smoking bans in the early 2000s.

== Journal of American Physicians and Surgeons ==
Journal of American Physicians and Surgeons
- Discipline: Medicine
- Language: English

Publication details
- Former name: Medical Sentinel
- History: 1996–present
- Publisher: Association of American Physicians and Surgeon
- Frequency: Quarterly

Standard abbreviations
- ISO 4: J. Am. Physicians Surg.

Indexing
- ISSN: 1543-4826

The association's Journal of American Physicians and Surgeons (JP&S) was previously named the Medical Sentinel from 1996 to 2003 and masquerades as a legitimate scientific journal. It is not listed in academic literature databases such as MEDLINE, PubMed, or the Web of Science. The quality and scientific validity of articles published in the journal have been criticized by medical experts, and some of the viewpoints advocated by AAPS are rejected by other scientists and medical groups. The U.S. National Library of Medicine declined repeated requests from AAPS to index the journal, citing unspecified concerns.

As of September 2016, JP&S was listed on Beall's List of potential or probable predatory open-access journals. Quackwatch lists JP&S as an untrustworthy, non-recommended periodical. An editorial in Chemical & Engineering News described the journal as a "purveyor of utter nonsense." Investigative journalist Brian Deer wrote that the journal is the "house magazine of a right-wing American fringe group [AAPS]" and "is barely credible as an independent forum." Writing in The Guardian, science columnist Ben Goldacre described the journal as the "in-house magazine of a rightwing US pressure group well known for polemics on homosexuality, abortion and vaccines."

=== Publishing of scientifically discredited claims ===
Articles and commentaries published in the journal have argued a number of scientifically discredited claims, including:

- That human activity has not contributed to climate change, and that global warming will be beneficial and thus is not a cause for concern.
- That HIV does not cause AIDS.
- That there is a link between abortion and the risk of breast cancer.
- That there are possible links between autism and vaccinations.
- That government efforts to encourage smoking cessation and emphasize the addictive nature of nicotine are misguided. In the fall of 2009, economist Michael Marlow published an article in AAPS' journal arguing that tobacco tax would decrease public health when people "switch to higher tar and nicotine brands as they smoke less."

A series of articles by anti-abortion authors published in the journal argued for a link between abortion and breast cancer. Such a link has been rejected by the scientific community, including the U.S. National Cancer Institute, the American Cancer Society, and the World Health Organization, among other major medical bodies.

A 2003 paper published in the journal, claiming that vaccination was harmful, was criticized for poor methodology, lack of scientific rigor, and outright errors, according to the World Health Organization and the American Academy of Pediatrics. A National Public Radio piece mentioned inaccurate information published in the journal and said: "The journal itself is not considered a leading publication, as it's put out by an advocacy group that opposes most government involvement in medical care."

The journal has also published articles advocating politically and socially conservative policy positions, including:

- That the Food and Drug Administration and Centers for Medicare and Medicaid Services are unconstitutional;
- That "humanists" have conspired to replace the "creation religion of Jehovah" with evolution;
- That "anchor babies" are valuable to undocumented immigrants, particularly if the babies are disabled.

=== Barack Obama hypnosis ===
Leading up to the 2008 presidential election, AAPS published an article claiming that then-candidate Barack Obama was captivating his audiences through hypnosis. The article was based on an unsigned 67-page paper anonymously published online in Arizona. Obama's speeches were analyzed for neuro-linguistic programming (NLP) techniques, based on the work of 20th century American psychologist Milton Erickson, including "extra slow speech, rhythm, tonalities, vagueness, visual imagery, metaphor, and raising of emotion", as well as the use of the "O" in Obama's logo as a "point of visual fixation".

=== Immigration and leprosy ===
In a 2005 article, Madeleine Cosman argued that illegal immigrants were carriers of disease, and that immigrants and "anchor babies" were launching a "stealthy assault on [American] medicine." In the article, Cosman claimed that "Suddenly, in the past 3 years America has more than 7,000 cases of leprosy" because of illegal aliens. The journal's leprosy claim was cited and repeated by Lou Dobbs as evidence of the dangers of illegal immigration.

Publicly available statistics show that the 7,000 cases of leprosy occurred during the past 30 years, not the past three as Cosman claimed. James Krahenbuhl, director of the U.S. government's leprosy program, stated that there had been no significant increase in leprosy cases, and that "It [leprosy] is not a public health problem—that's the bottom line." National Public Radio reported that the article "had footnotes that did not readily support allegations linking a recent rise in leprosy rates to illegal immigrants." The article's erroneous leprosy claim was pointed out by 60 Minutes, National Public Radio, and The New York Times. As of 2020, the article remained on the journal's website without having been corrected.

== Notable people ==
- Paul Driessen, attorney, author and climate change denier
- Stella Immanuel, Cameroonian-American physician and pastor
- Peter A. McCullough, former cardiologist at Baylor University Medical Center and advocate for COVID-19 hydroxychloroquine off-label medication
- Rand Paul, United States Senator
- Ron Paul, member of the U.S. House of Representatives
- Tom Price, Secretary of Health and Human Services under Donald Trump

== See also ==
- American College of Pediatricians
- America's Frontline Doctors
- Children's Health Defense
- Chloroquine and hydroxychloroquine during the COVID-19 pandemic
- Committee for a Constructive Tomorrow
- John Birch Society
