= Barbara Riegel =

American clinical researcher

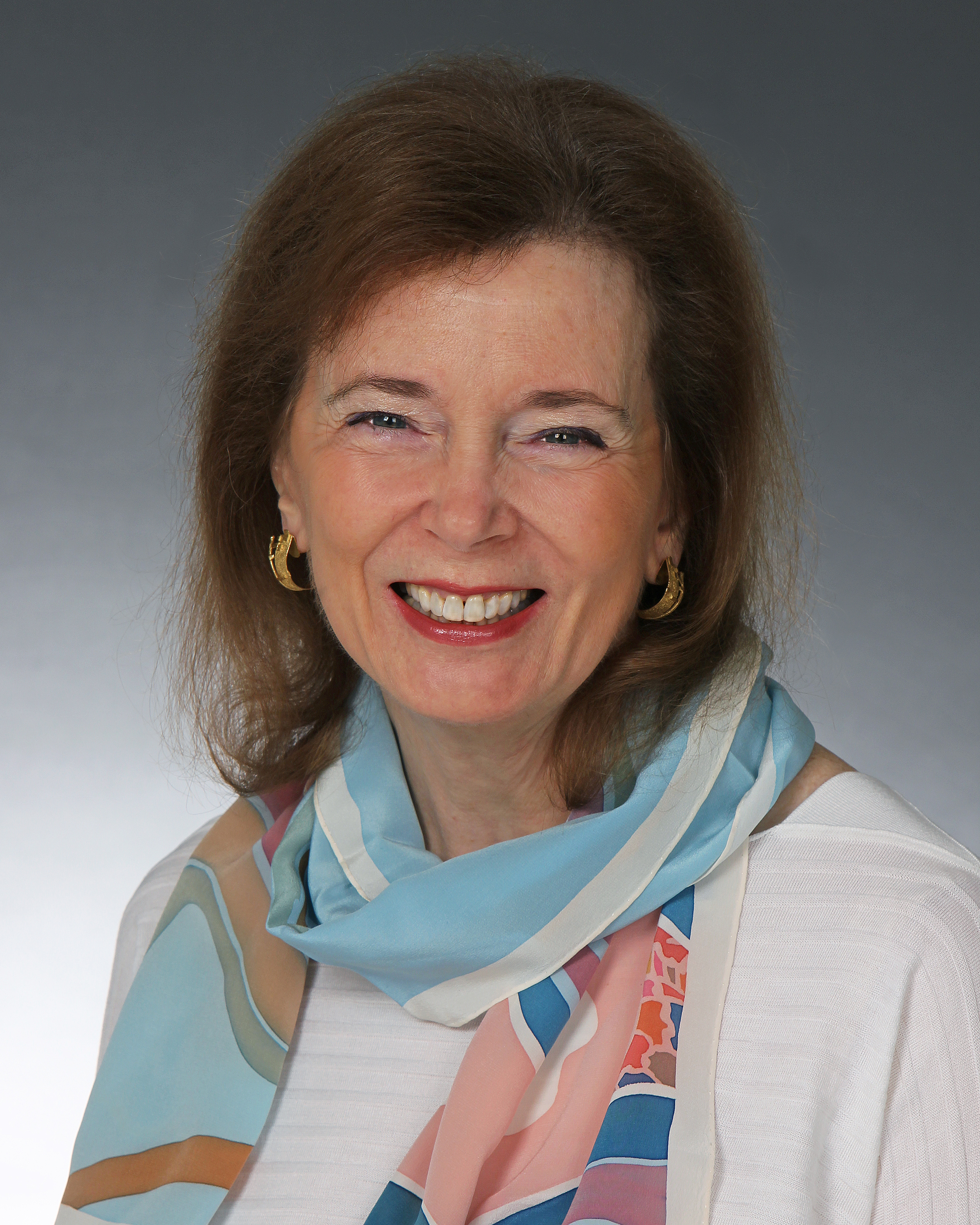
- Occupations: Clinical Researcher, Clinical Nurse Specialist, academic, and author
- Awards: Distinguished Scientist Award, American Heart Association; Sigma Theta Tau International Nurse Researcher Hall of Fame; Barbara J. Lowery Doctoral Student Organization Faculty Award, the University of Pennsylvania; Kathleen A. Dracup Lecturer in Exemplary Early Career Mentoring Award, American Heart Association and the Council on Cardiovascular and Stroke Nursing; President’s award for Research on Chronic Disease Management & Impact of Nursing in Promoting Self-Care, Friends of the National Institute of Nursing Research (FNINR)

Academic background
- Education: Diploma in Nursing; B.S., Nursing; M.N. Nursing; Ph.D., Nursing
- Alma mater: Jewish Hospital School of Nursing; San Diego State University; University of California, Los Angeles; University of Pennsylvania

Academic work
- Institutions: University of Pennsylvania; San Diego State University; Australian Catholic University

Barbara Riegel is an American clinical researcher, clinical nurse specialist, academic, and author. She is a professor in the School of Nursing at the University of Pennsylvania, a professor emerita at San Diego State University, and co-director of the International Center for Self-Care Research.

Riegel has published over 600 papers on various topics regarding self-care, such as treatment adherence, sleep, condition monitoring, and self-management of symptoms associated with chronic illness. She has developed theory and self-report measures of self-care. Her research in the field is supported by several organizations, including NIH, the Patient-Centered Outcomes Research Institute, and private foundations. She is the editor of 4 books, entitled Dreifus' Pacemaker Therapy: An Interprofessional Approach, Psychological Aspects of Critical Care Nursing, Improving Outcomes in Heart Failure: An Interdisciplinary Approach, and Cardiac Nursing: A Companion to Braunwald's Heart Disease.

Riegel is an elected Fellow of several professional organizations, including Heart Failure Society of America, Preventive Cardiovascular Nurses Association, American Heart Association, and the American Academy of Nursing. She is also the founding editor of the Journal of Cardiovascular Nursing.

== Education ==
After receiving a Diploma in Nursing from Jewish Hospital School of Nursing, Riegel attended San Diego State University and received her Bachelor’s degree in Nursing in 1981. Following this, she enrolled at the University of California Los Angeles, and earned her Master’s and Doctoral degree in Nursing in 1983 and 1991, respectively. In 2003, she obtained an honorary Master’s degree with major in Arts from the University of Pennsylvania. In 2022 she received an honorary Doctor of Medicine degree from Linköping University in Sweden.

== Career ==
Riegel started her academic career as a lecturer in the School of Nursing at San Diego State University in 1984, and then served there as an adjunct faculty till 1995, as an associate professor till 1998, and as professor till 2002. She is currently a professor emerita at San Diego State University. She held her next appointment at the University of Pennsylvania as an associate professor in 2002, and was promoted to professor (Professor Emerita) in School of Nursing at University of Pennsylvania Philadelphia in 2008, where she held the Edith Clemmer Steinbright Professor of Gerontology chair until her retirement in 2021. During her tenure at the University of Pennsylvania, she also held visiting appointments at Seattle University, Linköping University in Sweden, and the University of Rome Tor Vergata, Italy. She has also been serving as a Professorial Fellow at Australian Catholic University, Mary MacKillop Institute for Health Research since 2016.

From 1991 to 1995, she was appointed as managing director for the Clinical Research Department at Sharp HealthCare San Diego. At San Diego State University, she held appointment as the director of research for the School of Nursing from 2000 to 2002. At the University of Pennsylvania, as interim division chair of the Family and Community Health Division from 2009 to 2010, and as director of the Biobehavioral Research Center from 2011 to 2016.

Riegel’s clinical roles include her appointment as a staff nurse of intensive and coronary care units at Missouri Baptist Hospital St. Louis in 1974, and at Barnes Hospital of Washington University School of Medicine St. Louis in 1975. From 1983 till 1989, she was appointed by Scripps Clinic and Research Foundation La Jolla as Clinical Nurse Specialist, and also continued private practice as a clinical nurse specialist in San Diego. She held appointment as an advisor for Heart Failure Program Living Independently for Elders (LIFE) Program from 2013 till 2015.

Riegel has also served in numerous elected leadership positions in several different professional organizations. She was the organizer and director of the Community Health Organization in the United States Army from 1977 till 1978, as clinical researcher and senior clinical scientist at Sharp HealthCare San Diego from 1990 till 2002, as a Fulbright Senior Scholar – Australia from 2007 till 2008, as Internal Advisory Board member for Penn Institute on Aging (IOA) from 2011 till 2013, and as Fulbright Specialist from 2010 till 2015. She has been a senior fellow, Leonard Davis Institute University of Pennsylvania since 2003, and is co-director for the International Center for Self-Care Research since 2018.

== Research ==
Riegel has focused her research on self-care with particular attention on treatment adherence, sleep, condition monitoring, and self-management of symptoms. While keeping in view that heart failure was a primary reason for hospital readmissions, she began studying these issues early in her career while a Clinical Researcher in an acute care setting. With the passage of time, she expanded her research areas from a heart failure to adults with chronic illness and their caregivers. In 2022, she published an article and regarded symptom recognition as a mediator in the self-care of chronic illness, and further highlighted the important role of symptom recognition in self-care monitoring and self-care management behaviors. Furthermore, she highlighted the role of family in terms of facilitating a rapid improvement in self-care self-efficacy and a decrease in depressive symptoms, particularly among women.

Riegel conducts many research projects through her international collaborations with colleagues in Italy, Sweden, Australia, Hong Kong, Brazil, and beyond. These collaborations are facilitated through her International Center for Self-Care Research. Her current project is focused on clinical trial testing to demonstrate the efficacy of a health coaching intervention for caregivers of adults with heart failure, and is funded by the National Institutes of Health in the United States. Another project, funded by ACU, is an effort to identify what patients do to control their symptoms of a chronic illness.

Riegel published her book entitled Improving Outcomes in Heart Failure: An Interdisciplinary Approach in 2001. This book is described by S. Paul as a work which offers "a refreshing, new view on the management of heart failure." She also states that “the notable feature of this work is the presentation of practical examples of programs that have been developed to manage heart failure in the outpatient setting." Her other works are also focused on certain aspects of critical care nursing, and heart failure, and are also reviewed by reputed critics in the field.

== Awards and honors ==
- 1993 - Elected Fellow, American Academy of Nursing
- 1997 - Elected Fellow, American Heart Association
- 1998 - Heart Failure Research Prize, American Heart Association Council on Cardiovascular Nursing and Otsuka America, Inc.
- 1999 - Distinguished Research Lectureship Award, American Association of Critical Care Nurses
- 2000 - Distinguished Faculty Award, San Diego State University, College of Health and Human Services
- 2000 - San Diego State University Alumni Association Award For Outstanding Faculty Contributions to San Diego State University
- 2001 - First Annual Nursing Research Award, Heart Failure Society of America
- 2002 - Research Award, Gamma Gamma chapter, Sigma Theta Tau
- 2005 - American Heart Association, Council on Cardiovascular Nursing, Katharine A. Lembright Award
- 2007 - Barbara J. Lowery Doctoral Student Organization Faculty Award, the University of Pennsylvania
- 2009 - American Heart Association Council on Cardiovascular Nursing (CVN)- Top 10 Scientists in Cardiovascular Nursing
- 2012 - Claire M. Fagin Distinguished Researcher Award, University of Pennsylvania
- 2013 - President’s award for Research on Chronic Disease Management & Impact of Nursing in Promoting Self-Care, Friends of the National Institute of Nursing Research (FNINR)
- 2014 - Christian R. & Mary E. Lindback Award for Distinguished Teaching, University of Pennsylvania
- 2014 - Distinguished Alumni Award, Barnes Jewish Alumni Association
- 2015 - Elected Fellow, Preventive Cardiovascular Nurses Association
- 2015 - Sigma Theta Tau International Nurse Researcher Hall of Fame
- 2015 - Kathleen A. Dracup Lecturer in Exemplary Early Career Mentoring award, American Heart Association and the Council on Cardiovascular and Stroke Nursing
- 2015 - Distinguished Scientist Award, American Heart Association
- 2017 - Nursing Leadership Award, Heart Failure Society of America
- 2017 - Elected Fellow, Heart Failure Society of America
- 2018 - SYNERGY Award for the Best Nursing Research Oral Presentation, CHARMS 2018, Canberra, Australia
- 2018 - Highly Cited Researcher, Web of Science
- 2019 - Senior Faculty Research Award, Department of Biobehavioral Health Sciences, University of Pennsylvania School of Nursing
- 2022 - Honorary Doctor of Medicine, Linkoping University, Sweden

== Bibliography ==
=== Books ===
- Dreifus' Pacemaker Therapy: An Interprofessional Approach (1986) ISBN 9780803673304
- Psychological Aspects of Critical Care Nursing (1989) ISBN 9780871897992
- Improving Outcomes in Heart Failure: An Interdisciplinary Approach (2001) ISBN 9780834216440
- Cardiac Nursing: A Companion to Braunwald's Heart Disease (2007) ISBN 9781437735598

=== Selected articles ===
- Riegel, B., Moser, D. K., Buck, H. G., Dickson, V. V., Dunbar, S. B., Lee, C. S., ... & American Heart Association Council on Cardiovascular and Stroke Nursing; Council on Peripheral Vascular Disease; and Council on Quality of Care and Outcomes Research. (2017). Self-care for the prevention and management of cardiovascular disease and stroke: A scientific statement for healthcare professionals from the American Heart Association. Journal of the American Heart Association, 6(9), e006997.
- Pak, V. M., Strouss, L., Yaggi, H. K., Redeker, N. S., Mohsenin, V., & Riegel, B. (2019). Mechanisms of reduced sleepiness symptoms in heart failure and obstructive sleep apnea. Journal of sleep research, 28(5), e12778.
- Riegel, B., Daus, M., Lozano, A. J., Malone, S. K., Patterson, F., & Hanlon, A. L. (2019). Shift workers have higher blood pressure medicine use, but only when they are short sleepers: A longitudinal UK biobank study. Journal of the American Heart Association, 8(20), e013269.
- Knafl, G. J., Moser, D. K., Wu, J. R., & Riegel, B. (2019). Discontinuation of angiotensin-converting enzyme inhibitors or beta-blockers and the impact on heart failure hospitalization rates. European Journal of Cardiovascular Nursing, 18(8), 667-678.
- Riegel, B., Barbaranelli, C., Carlson, B., Sethares, K. A., Daus, M., Moser, D. K., ... & Vellone, E. (2019). Psychometric testing of the revised self-care of heart failure index. The Journal of cardiovascular nursing, 34(2), 183.
- Riegel, B., Dunbar, S. B., Fitzsimons, D., Freedland, K. E., Lee, C. S., Middleton, S., ... & Jaarsma, T. (2021). Self-care research: Where are we now? Where are we going?. International journal of nursing studies, 116, 103402.
- Riegel, B., Dickson, V. V., & Vellone, E. (2022). The Situation-Specific Theory of Heart Failure Self-care: An Update on the Problem, Person, and Environmental Factors Influencing Heart Failure Self-care. Journal of Cardiovascular Nursing, 10-1097.
