= Amit Patel =

Indian-American cardiac surgeon

Amit Nilkanth Patel is an Indian-American cardiac surgeon and former director of clinical regenerative medicine and tissue engineering at the University of Utah in Salt Lake City. He was a tenured professor of surgery-cardiothoracic at the University of Utah until December 2016.

== Early life and career ==
Patel studied medicine at Case Western Reserve University. In 2002, he led a "breakthrough" study demonstrating that stem cell transplantation could treat congestive heart failure.

He is currently the national lead investigator for Aastrom Biosciences, now Vericel Corp, to treat both ischemic and non-ischemic cardiomyopathy by using adult stem cells. He just completed and published the largest heart failure trial for cell therapy in patients with ischemic heart failure. The trial was published in the journal Lancet and demonstrated a 37% reduction in death and hospitalizations for patients with severe heart failure.

He is also the lead investigator for several trials to use adult stem cells to treat limb ischemia (inadequate blood flow to the leg). He has taught many surgeons around the world in countries such as Thailand and India. Notable patients of his include Hawaiian singer Don Ho; Ho credited Patel's 2005 procedure on him with saving his life and allowing him to return to performing after being forced into retirement for health reasons. He is currently working on programs for type 2 diabetes, burn wound therapies with the U.S. military & arteriocyte, traumatic brain injury, and plastic reconstruction. He has started collaborative programs in Peru, Argentina, Ecuador, Germany, and India. His newest program is to treat heart failure patients with one-day outpatient cell therapies – harvest. Patel has recently developed a stem cell spray for rapid healing of heart surgery and burns. He is also the founder of Xogenex LLC, a gene therapy company for heart failure. The project is code-named the "Bourne-Project" because it has multiple genes to improve heart function which can be regulated and non-virally integrated into patients. He is also the co-founder of Jadi Cell LLC which involves a novel xenofree umbilical cord stem cell that is currently being used in a number of clinical trials.

Patel was involved in a retracted study, authored by Mandeep R. Mehra and Sapan Desai, relating to using hydroxychloroquine to treat COVID-19 during the COVID-19 pandemic, which used suspect data from Surgisphere. It was published in The Lancet which retracted it. He co-authored another COVID-19 study that also used suspect data from Surgisphere and which was retracted by New England Journal of Medicine. Patel and Desai are related by marriage. In June 2020 both journals retracted the study and the University of Utah terminated Patel's position over the papers. Upon further independent investigation, it was determined that it was Patel that called for the retraction of both papers as he could not verify the veracity of the Surgisphere program. He had also already verbally resigned from his volunteer position at the University of Utah long before the story in stat news. Richard Horton, editor in chief of The Lancet, called the paper a fabrication and "a monumental fraud". Eric Rubin, editor-in-chief of NEJM, said "We shouldn't have published this."

Additionally, Patel's University of Utah profile claimed 100 publications, nearly two-thirds of which he did not write but were co-authored by other individuals with the same surname.
