= Douglas Mann =

Douglas Mann may refer to:

- Douglas L. Mann, American physician
- Douglas Mann (politician), member of the Missouri House of Representatives

== See also ==
- Bruce Douglas-Mann, British politician
