= Vladimir Zelenko =

Ukrainian-American physician (1973–2022)

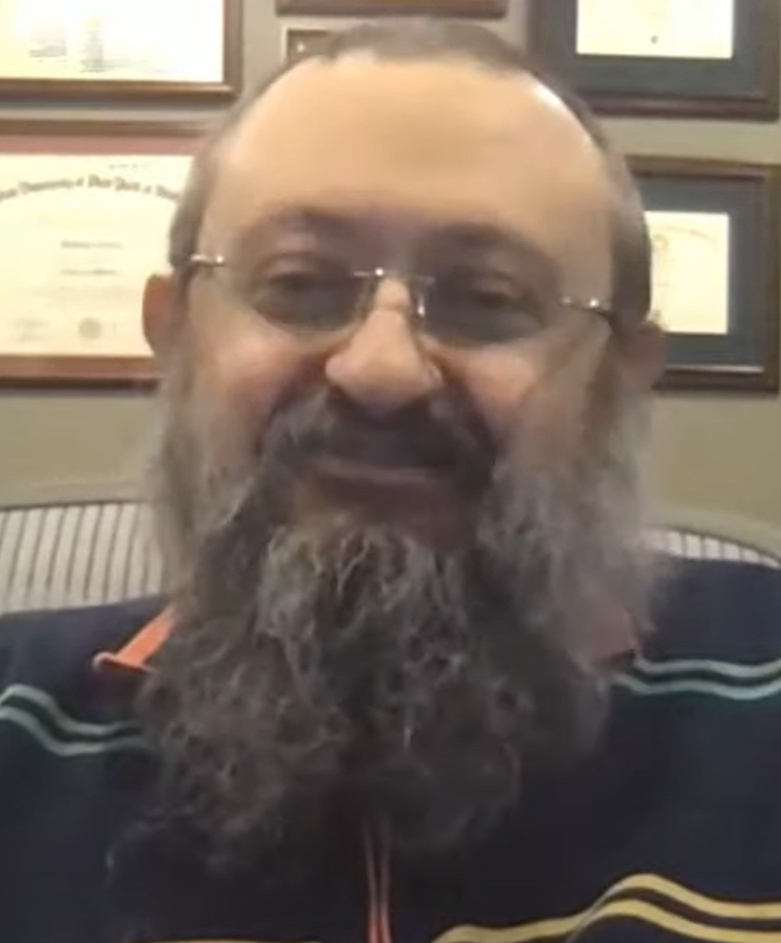
- Zelenko in 2020
- Born: November 27, 1973; Kiev, Ukrainian SSR, Soviet Union
- Died: June 30, 2022 (aged 48); Dallas, Texas, U.S.
- Education: State University of New York at Buffalo (MD)
- Occupations: Family physician, supplement salesperson
- Known for: Promoting hydroxychloroquine-based treatment of COVID-19
- Website: Official website

Vladimir Zelenko (November 27, 1973 – June 30, 2022) was an American family physician. He was born in Kiev, Ukrainian SSR. At the age of three, his family moved to the United States and settled in Brooklyn, New York City. He received his medical degree from the State University of New York at Buffalo in 2000. He was an Orthodox Jew.

As an author, he was known for promoting a three-drug combination of hydroxychloroquine, zinc sulfate, and azithromycin as part of an experimental outpatient treatment for COVID-19 that he called the Zelenko Protocol. He also promoted unfounded medical advice, conspiracy theories, and misinformation about COVID-19 vaccination.

On March 23, 2020, Zelenko published an open letter to U.S. president Donald Trump where he claimed to have successfully treated hundreds of COVID-19 patients with a five-day course of his protocol. Zelenko's treatment protocol quickly gained notoriety, with several right-wing media figures and various Trump administration officials promoting it, including Rudy Giuliani and then-White House Chief of Staff Mark Meadows, despite cautionary messages from health experts.

== Early life and education ==
Vladimir "Zev" Zelenko was born to Larisa (Portnoy) Zelenko and Alex in Kyiv, Ukraine (then, part of Soviet Ukraine), on November 27, 1973. His father was a taxi driver and his mother worked at a fur factory before working as a computer programmer at Morgan Stanley. His family moved to the U.S. when he was three years old, and settled in the Sheepshead Bay neighborhood in Brooklyn, New York City.

Zelenko earned a Doctor of Medicine degree in 2000 from the State University of New York at Buffalo and subsequently specialized in family medicine.

== COVID-19 treatment and vaccine claims ==
On March 21, 2020, Zelenko posted a video to YouTube and Facebook addressed to U.S. president Donald Trump, in which he claimed to have successfully tested an experimental treatment for COVID-19 on hundreds of patients with coronavirus-like symptoms. He described the treatment as a three-drug combination consisting of the anti-malarial medication hydroxychloroquine, the antibiotic azithromycin, and zinc sulfate, and posted an open letter to Trump with similar claims two days later. At the time, ongoing research was being conducted by various groups, including the World Health Organization, to determine the efficacy of using hydroxychloroquine and/or azithromycin to treat COVID-19. In March 2020, Alex Kasprak, a science writer for Snopes, noted that since Zelenko did not describe his study design nor publish any data, his claims were unverifiable.

In July 2020, the month after the U.S. Food and Drug Administration withdrew emergency use authorization of hydroxychloroquine for COVID-19, Zelenko coauthored a retrospective study of 141 COVID-19 outpatients who were prescribed a combination of zinc, hydroxychloroquine, and azithromycin. Zelenko's study compared the outcomes of treated patients to untreated patients in his New York community, with hospitalization rates of 2.8% for treated patients and 15.4% for untreated. Based on the study, Zelenko said that his combination therapy "resulted in five times less hospitalizations and deaths". A higher quality RECOVERY trial (Randomized Evaluation of COVID-19 therapy) comparing a range of possible treatments with usual care in patients hospitalized with Covid-19 found that patients who received hydroxychloroquine "did not have a lower incidence of death at 28 days than those who received usual care." However, since this study used hospitalized patients it may not be directly applicable to Zelenko's focus on early treatment. The National Institutes of Health ultimately recommended against the use of zinc, hydroxychloroquine and azithromycin in treatments for COVID-19.

The Satmar Hasidic community in Kiryas Joel, New York in Monroe, New York, where Zelenko was a long-time community physician, disputed Zelenko's claims about the potential infection rate in the community, which prompted Zelenko to shut down his office after nearly 20 years.

In December 2020, Twitter suspended Zelenko's account for violating rules against "platform manipulation and spam".

In 2021, Zelenko began selling a dietary supplement called Z-Stack, which contained zinc and several vitamins. Fact-checkers noted the lack of scientific support for Zelenko's claims of Z-Stack's ingredients boosting immunity, killing the virus that causes COVID-19, and preventing hospitalization.

In January 2022, Zelenko claimed that children are more likely to die from COVID-19 vaccines than from COVID-19.

=== Zelenko's FDA approval claim ===
In April 2020, Zelenko presented a lecture over Zoom to a group of physicians, in which he alleged that the Food and Drug Administration (FDA) had granted approval to a clinical trial he was helping organize. The lecture was attended by conservative commentator Jerome Corsi, who had been collaborating with Zelenko on a telemedicine Web site. Corsi inadvertently sent an email mentioning that Zelenko had "an FDA approved randomized test of HCQ underway" to federal prosecutor Aaron Zelinsky, instead of Zelenko. Zelinsky, who worked on former special counsel Robert Mueller's team, had previously questioned Corsi during the investigation of Roger Stone.

According to Corsi, Zelinsky responded to his email and asked whether he had an attorney, and subsequently informed Corsi's attorney that he had discovered that Zelenko's study was not listed on a government website of FDA-approved clinical trials. Zelinsky requested all communications between Corsi and Zelenko, including text messages, podcast documents, and marketing materials for their website, which Corsi supplied. Zelenko denied any wrongdoing and said that he thought that his study had FDA approval because he had spoken with FDA commissioner Stephen Hahn.

== Personal life ==
Zelenko was married twice and had eight children.

In 2019, Zelenko published an autobiography, Metamorphosis, that explores his journey and transformation from an irreligious, Jewish Russian-American young man to a baal teshuva (newly religious Jew), which helped him form close ties with many diverse Jewish communities, and how circumstances in his life provided him with the willpower to overcome the challenges he had been handed, including a life-threatening disease. Zelenko also lectured about his personal story and the book he wrote about it. He also told of his personal journey in Mishpacha magazine. Also in 2019, Zelenko co-authored with one of his sons, Levi Yitzchok Zelenko, a book about Kabbalah, on Jewish mysticism, Hasidism, called Essence To Essence, which "describes the metaphysical dynamics shared by science, medicine, psychology, economics, law, and politics".

Zelenko died at a hospital in Florida where he was undergoing treatment for lung cancer on June 30, 2022, at the age of 48. He had been battling cancer for several years. He is survived by his wife and eight children.

== See also ==
- Chloroquine and hydroxychloroquine during the COVID-19 pandemic
