= Surgisphere =

Healthcare analytics company based in United States

- Type: Private
- Industry: Healthcare analytics
- Founded: 2008
- Headquarters: Palatine, Illinois, US
- Key people: Sapan Desai (CEO and founder)
- Number of employees: 11
- Website: surgisphere.com

Surgisphere is an American healthcare analytics company established in 2008 by Sapan Desai. Originally a textbook marketing company, it came under scrutiny in May 2020 after it provided large datasets of COVID-19 patients that were subsequently found to be unreliable. The questionable data were used in studies published in The Lancet and The New England Journal of Medicine in May 2020, suggesting that COVID-19 patients on hydroxychloroquine had a "significantly higher risk of death". In light of these studies, the World Health Organization decided to temporarily halt global trials of the drug hydroxychloroquine to treat COVID-19. After the studies were retracted, the WHO trials were resumed and then discontinued shortly after.

== History ==
Surgisphere was established in 2008 by Sapan Desai, then a medical resident, to market medical textbooks to medical students. Fake five-star reviews on Amazon from accounts impersonating actual physicians were found. Desai became a vascular surgeon and worked at Northwest Community Hospital.

Surgisphere had three subsidiaries: Surgical Outcomes Collaborative, Vascular Outcomes and Quartz Clinical. From 2010 to 2013 it published an online medical journal, the Journal of Surgical Radiology. It ceased publication despite having claimed to accrue 50,000 subscribers because Desai "ran out of time".

In June 2020 Desai's spokesperson said Surgisphere had 11 employees and had been compiling a global hospital records database since 2008. In its promotional material and press releases, Surgisphere claimed to have a cloud-based healthcare data analytics platform and to be "leveraging... its global research network and advanced machine learning" using decision tree analysis.

After the retractions of two studies in June 2020, company social media accounts were deleted, and on 15 June 2020, the company website was taken offline.

== COVID-19 misconduct ==
=== Diagnostic tool ===
Starting in March 2020, Surgisphere promoted a "rapid diagnostic tool" for COVID-19, which it said was in use by over 1000 hospitals. The African Federation for Emergency Medicine (AFEM) had promoted the COVID-19 Severity Scoring Tool for use in 26 countries and some institutions had started validation studies. On 5 June 2020, following the scandal about the Lancet and NEJM articles, AFEM recommended that the tool no longer be used.

=== Ivermectin preprint ===
In April 2020, Desai et al. published a paper based on purported Surgisphere data which suggested ivermectin reduced COVID-19 mortality. It was described as a "retrospective matched-control study of coronavirus patients using a real-time hospitalization database". It was published as a preprint but was retracted at the end of May. Several Latin American government health organizations recommended ivermectin as a COVID-19 treatment based, in part, on this preprint; these recommendations were later denounced by the Pan American Health Organization.

=== Lancet and NEJM articles ===
Surgisphere provided dubious data used for studies of COVID-19 that were published in The Lancet and The New England Journal of Medicine (NEJM) in May 2020. The Lancet study claimed that the dataset of hospital records showed that patients taking hydroxychloroquine were more likely to die in hospital, and prompted the World Health Organization to halt global trials of the drug to treat COVID-19. The NEJM study claimed that hospital data records showed that COVID-19 patients were not harmed by treatment with ACE inhibitors and angiotensin-receptor blockers.

The dataset from the alleged 1200 hospitals had many errors, including the listing of an Asian hospital as being in Australia, and no indications of how Surgisphere could collect the data, and was widely criticised. As a result, on 28 May over 200 researchers and doctors from various countries published "An open letter to Richard Horton, editor-in-chief of The Lancet, regarding Mehra et al", stating "Both the numbers of cases and deaths, and the detailed data collection, seem unlikely." Science Magazine said critics had "pointed out many red flags in the Lancet paper, including the astonishing number of patients involved and details about their demographics and prescribed dosing that seem implausible." One of the signatories, Adrian Hernandez of the Duke Clinical Research Institute, said "the biggest thing that raised a red flag was that there was such a large database across more than 600 hospitals, and no one had really known about its existence".

On 3 June 2020, The Lancet and the NEJM released online "expressions of concern" about the published studies, and on 4 June the Lancet paper was retracted by Mehra, Ruschitzka, and Amit Patel, all authors except Desai. In their retraction, the three wrote Surgisphere had not transferred "the full dataset, client contracts, and the full ISO audit report to their servers for analysis as such transfer would violate client agreements and confidentiality requirements", preventing reviewers from conducting an independent and private peer review. The three authors said:

"We can never forget the responsibility we have as researchers to scrupulously ensure that we rely on data sources that adhere to our high standards. Based on this development, we can no longer vouch for the veracity of the primary data sources. Due to this unfortunate development, the authors request that the paper be retracted."

On 4 June, The Lancet retracted the study, as did the NEJM. In the meantime, on 3 June, the WHO resumed its hydroxychloroquine drug trials.

On 6 June 2020, NHS Scotland told the Financial Times that they had "no current or past contractual arrangement" with Surgisphere, nor was the company an approved supplier, nor had it ever had access to data, despite Surgisphere stating it had "collaborated" with the NHS. Surgisphere's website had a picture of Queen Elizabeth University Hospital, an NHS hospital in Glasgow.

On 7 June 2020, fellow author Amit Patel's position with the University of Utah was terminated over the journal retractions. Patel is Desai's brother-in-law.

Richard Horton, editor-in-chief of The Lancet, called the paper "a fabrication" and "a monumental fraud". Eric Rubin, editor-in-chief of NEJM, said "We shouldn’t have published this".

== General legitimacy ==
A July 2020 article in New York Times described an employee extracting data manually to create a spreadsheet for Surgisphere's QuartzClinical. She was "surprised" by claims of a massive data store, stating she knew of only a single hospital that had signed a contract with the company; the May 1 paper in NEJM claimed to use data from 169 hospitals across the globe, and the May 22 paper in The Lancet.

A parallel investigation by the British newspaper The Guardian revealed that several of Surgisphere's employees had little or no scientific background; one employee appeared to be a science fiction author while another, listed as a marketing executive, was an adult model. The Guardian also found that Surgisphere's LinkedIn page has fewer than 100 followers and in late May 2020 listed only six employees. It also found that the company had almost no online presence and that its Twitter account had made no posts from October 2017 to March 2020.

Elisabeth Bik et al. analyzed one of Desai's early first author papers and found apparent evidence of image manipulation.
