= Chloroquine and hydroxychloroquine during the COVID-19 pandemic =

Early experimental treatment efforts during the start of COVID-19 pandemic

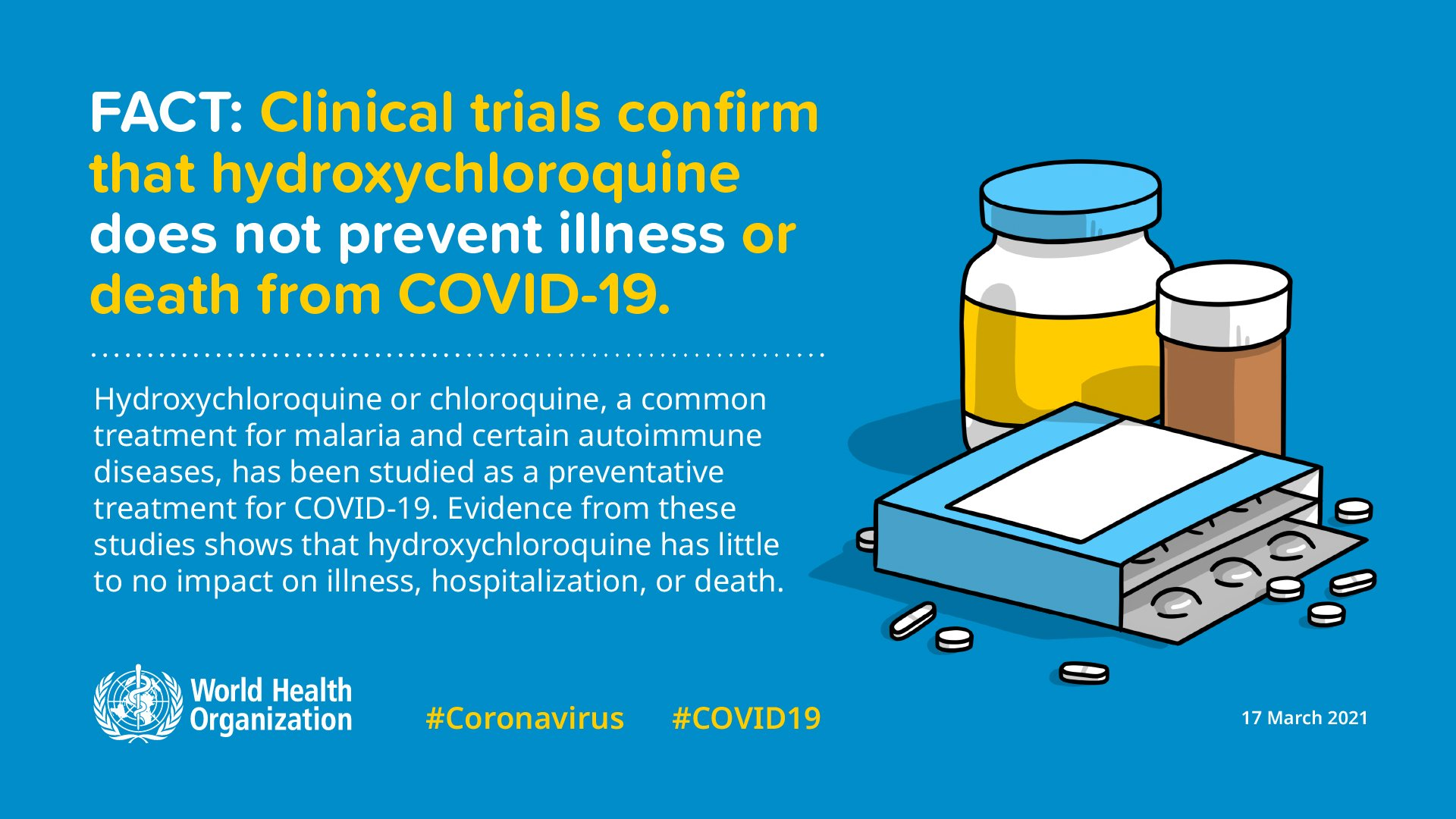
A World Health Organization infographic that states that hydroxychloroquine does not prevent illness or death from COVID-19

Chloroquine and hydroxychloroquine are anti-malarial medications also used against some auto-immune diseases. Chloroquine, along with hydroxychloroquine, was an early experimental treatment for COVID-19. Neither drug has been useful to prevent or treat SARS-CoV-2 infection. Administration of chloroquine or hydroxychloroquine to COVID-19 patients, either as monotherapies or in conjunction with azithromycin, has been associated with deleterious outcomes, such as QT prolongation. Scientific evidence does not substantiate the efficacy of hydroxychloroquine, with or without the addition of azithromycin, in the therapeutic management of COVID-19.

Cleavage of the SARS-CoV-2 S2 spike protein required for viral entry into cells can be accomplished by proteases TMPRSS2 located on the cell membrane, or by cathepsins (primarily cathepsin L) in endolysosomes. Hydroxychloroquine inhibits the action of cathepsin L in endolysosomes, but because cathepsin L cleavage is minor compared to TMPRSS2 cleavage, hydroxychloroquine does little to inhibit SARS-CoV-2 infection.

Several countries initially used chloroquine or hydroxychloroquine for treatment of persons hospitalized with COVID-19 (as of March 2020), though the drug was not formally approved through clinical trials. From April to June 2020, there was an emergency use authorization for their use in the United States, and was used off label for potential treatment of the disease. On 24 April 2020, citing the risk of "serious heart rhythm problems", the FDA posted a caution against using the drug for COVID-19 "outside of the hospital setting or a clinical trial".

Their use was withdrawn as a possible treatment for COVID-19 infection when it proved to have no benefit for hospitalized patients with severe COVID-19 illness in the international Solidarity trial and UK RECOVERY Trial. On 15 June 2020, the FDA revoked its emergency use authorization, stating that it was "no longer reasonable to believe" that the drug was effective against COVID-19 or that its benefits outweighed "known and potential risks". In late 2020, the National Institutes of Health issued treatment guidelines recommending against the use of hydroxychloroquine for COVID-19 except as part of a clinical trial.

In 2021, hydroxychloroquine was part of the recommended treatment for mild cases in India.

In 2020, the speculative use of hydroxychloroquine for COVID-19 threatened its availability for people with established indications (malaria and auto-immune diseases).

== Background ==
Chloroquine is an anti-malarial medication that is also used against some auto-immune diseases. Hydroxychloroquine is more commonly available than chloroquine in the United States. Hydroxychloroquine is used as a prophylactic in India.

Hydroxychloroquine and chloroquine have numerous, potentially serious, side effects, such as retinopathy, hypoglycemia, or life-threatening arrhythmia and cardiomyopathy. Both drugs have extensive interactions with prescription drugs, affecting the therapeutic dose and disease mitigation. Some people have allergic reactions to these drugs. The NIH recommended against the use of a combination of hydroxychloroquine and azithromycin because of the resulting increased risk of sudden cardiac death. Widespread administration of chloroquine or hydroxychloroquine, either alone or in combination with azithromycin, among COVID-19 patients, has been associated with increased mortality due to adverse effects, including QT prolongation.

In October 2021 a large network of companies selling hydroxychloroquine and ivermectin has been disclosed in the US, targeting primarily right-wing and vaccine hesitant groups through social media and conspiracy videos by anti-vaccine activists such as Simone Gold. The network had 72,000 customers who collectively paid $15 million for consultations and medications.

== Timeline ==
Chloroquine was initially recommended by Indian, Chinese, South Korean and Italian health authorities for the treatment of COVID-19, although these agencies and the US CDC noted contraindications for people with heart disease or diabetes. In February 2020, both drugs were shown to effectively reduce COVID-19 illness in vitro, but a further study concluded that hydroxychloroquine was more potent than chloroquine and had a more tolerable safety profile.

On 18 March 2020, the World Health Organization (WHO) announced that chloroquine and the related hydroxychloroquine would be among the four drugs studied as part of the multinational Solidarity clinical trial.

On 19 March 2020, US president Donald Trump encouraged the use of chloroquine and hydroxychloroquine during a national press conference. These endorsements led to massive increases in public demand for the drugs in the United States. Beginning in March 2020, Trump began promoting hydroxychloroquine to prevent or treat COVID-19, citing small numbers of anecdotal reports. Trump stated in June that he was taking the drug as a preventive measure, stimulating unprecedented worldwide demand and causing shortages of hydroxychloroquine for its prescribed purpose of preventing malaria.

New York governor Andrew Cuomo announced that New York State trials of chloroquine and hydroxychloroquine would begin on 24 March. On 28 March, the US Food and Drug Administration (FDA) authorized the use of hydroxychloroquine sulfate and chloroquine phosphate under an Emergency Use Authorization (EUA), which was later revoked due to the risk of cardiac adverse events. The drug was authorized under the EUA as an experimental treatment for emergency use in hospitalized patients.

In late March 2020, an Arizona man died of cardiac arrest and his wife was hospitalized after the couple ingested a version of chloroquine used as a parasite treatment for aquarium fish. The couple had incorrectly believed that the parasite treatment would have the same effects as the medication form of chloroquine. The surviving wife stated that the couple self-administered the chemical after listening to speeches by President Donald Trump that touted chloroquine as an effective treatment against COVID-19.

Beginning in March 2020, New Jersey state senator Joe Pennacchio began publicly calling for the use of hydroxychloroquine to combat the spread of COVID-19 based on a French study which showed a decrease in "viral shedding." He received support from over 60 doctors and advocacy groups across the United States, including Sheila Page and Marilyn Singleton from the Association of American Physicians and Surgeons, Niran Al-Agba from Physicians for Patient Protection and Frank Alario of the American College of Physicians.

On 28 March 2020, the FDA authorized the use of hydroxychloroquine and chloroquine under an emergency use authorization (EUA). The experimental treatment was first authorized only for emergency use for people hospitalized but unable to receive treatment in a clinical trial.

On 1 April 2020, the European Medicines Agency (EMA) issued guidance that chloroquine and hydroxychloroquine are only to be used in clinical trials or emergency use programs.

On 9 April 2020, the National Institutes of Health began the first clinical trial to assess whether hydroxychloroquine is safe and effective to treat COVID-19. A Veterans Affairs study released results on 21 April suggesting COVID-19-hospitalized patients treated with hydroxychloroquine were more likely to die than those who received no drug treatment at all, after correcting for clinical characteristics.

On 24 April 2020, the FDA cautioned against using the drug outside a hospital setting or clinical trial after reviewing case reports of adverse effects including ventricular tachycardia, ventricular fibrillation and in some cases death. According to Johns Hopkins' ABX Guide for COVID-19, "Hydroxychloroquine may cause prolonged QT, and caution should be used in critically ill COVID-19 patients who may have cardiac dysfunction or if combined with other drugs that cause QT prolongation". Caution was also recommended as to the combination of chloroquine and hydroxychloroquine with treatments which might inhibit the CYP3A4 enzyme (by which these drugs are metabolized). As such, combination might indirectly result in higher plasma levels of chloroquine and hydroxychloroquine, and thus enhance the risk for significant QT prolongation. CYP3A4 inhibitors include Azithromycin, ritonavir, and lopinavir.

On 27 April 2020 the Association of American Physicians and Surgeons wrote a letter, signed by Jane Orient and Michael Robb, to Arizona governor Doug Ducey asking to rescind his executive order forbidding the use of hydrochloroquine as a treatment for COVID-19. The executive order was signed on 2 April 2020.

On 5 June 2020, use of hydroxychloroquine in the UK RECOVERY Trial was discontinued when an interim analysis of 1,542 treatments showed it provided no mortality benefit to people hospitalized with severe COVID-19 infection over 28 days of observation.

On 15 June 2020, the FDA revoked the emergency use authorization for hydroxychloroquine and chloroquine, stating that although the evaluation of both these drugs under clinical trials continues, the FDA (after interagency consultation with the Biomedical Advanced Research and Development Authority (BARDA)) concluded that, based on new information and other information discussed "... it is no longer reasonable to believe that oral formulations of hydroxychloroquine (HCQ) and chloroquine (CQ) may be effective in treating COVID-19, nor is it reasonable to believe that the known and potential benefits of these products outweigh their known and potential risks".

On 23 July 2020, results were published from a multicenter, randomized, open-label, three-group, controlled trial of 667 participants in Brazil which found no benefit from using hydroxychloroquine, alone or with azithromycin, to treat mild-to-moderate COVID-19. In July, the U.S. President Donald Trump once again promoted the use of the drug contradicting various public health officials, including National Institute of Allergy and Infectious Diseases director Dr. Anthony Fauci.

In November 2020, a U.S. National Institutes of Health clinical trial evaluating the safety and effectiveness of hydroxychloroquine for the treatment of adults with COVID-19 formally concluded that the drug provided no clinical benefit for COVID-19 treatment and recommended against its use.

A Cochrane review from February 2021 came to the conclusion, that hydroxychloroquine has little or no effect on the risk of death. Besides, adverse events are tripled compared to placebo. The authors came to the conclusion that no further trials of hydroxychloroquine or chloroquine for treatment of COVID-19 should be carried out.

On 26 April 2021, in its amended clinical management protocol for COVID-19, the Indian Ministry of Health lists hydroxychloroquine for use in patients during the early course of the disease.

In August 2022, a meta-analysis led by Harvard epidemiologist Miguel Hernán found that the aggregate of pre-exposure prophylaxis trials with hydroxychloroquine suggested no statistically significant finding of hydoxychloqoruine as a prophylactic, but suggested gaps and exaggerations in early studies and opportunities for future improvements. Evidence of effectiveness in this setting was also provided by a large multicenter study led by the Centre for Tropical Medicine and Global Health at the University of Oxford, published only in 2024, which found a 15% decrease in symptomatic infections with prophylaxis, on the edge of statistical significance. Both studies argued that the controversies surrounding the drug early in the pandemic led to the premature closure of studies and to difficulties in trial recruitment, ultimately hurting scientific enquiry about its effectiveness.

A French study published in 2024 found that the use of hydroxychloroquine may have been associated with 17,000 deaths in Belgium, Turkey, France, Italy, Spain, and the United States. This study was ultimately retracted on August 22, 2024, after "the Editor-in-Chief found the conclusions of the article to be unreliable".

== Combined with zinc and another antibiotic ==
Due to the properties of zinc as a cofactor in the immune response for producing antibodies during viral infections, as of May 2020 it was being included among multiple-agent "cocktails" for investigating potential treatment of people hospitalized with COVID-19 infection. One such cocktail – hydroxychloroquine combined with a high dose of zinc (as a sulfate, 220 mg (50 mg elemental Zn) per day for five days, a zinc dose ~4 times higher than the reference daily intake level) and an approved antibiotic, either azithromycin or doxycycline – began in May as a Phase IV trial in New York State. However, caution was recommended about the combination of chloroquine or hydroxychloroquine with CYP3A4 inhibitors, such as azithromycin, a treatment combination found to be ineffective for preventing death in hospitalized people with COVID-19. There was preliminary evidence that combining hydroxychloroquine and azithromycin for treating non-hospitalized ("outpatient") people with COVID-19 infection with multiple comorbidities was effective, but this evidence was not confirmed by later studies: co-administration of chloroquine or hydroxychloroquine with azithromycin has been associated with increased mortality due to adverse effects, including QT prolongation.

Zinc deficiency – which decreases immune capacity to defend against pathogens – is common among elderly people, and may be a susceptibility factor in viral infections. The mechanism for any potential benefit of including zinc in a cocktail treatment for recovery from severe COVID-19 or any viral infection is unknown.

== Prophylaxis ==
Drugs used for treatment of infectious diseases may also be considered for use for post-exposure prophylaxis. On 22 May, The Lancet published a response to criticism of the Indian government's decision to allow chemoprophylaxis with hydroxychloroquine for some high risk persons who may have had exposure to COVID. Researchers supporting prophylactic administration of hydroxychloquine note that results from human trials have suggested that hydroxychloroquine may decrease the duration of both viral shedding and symptoms if the drug is administered early.

On 3 June, results were published from a randomized, double-blind, placebo-controlled trial of 821 participants which found that hydroxychloroquine did not prevent symptomatic COVID-19 illness when used for post-exposure prophylaxis. A randomized, multicenter, placebo-controlled trial amongst healthcare workers found that oral hydroxychloroquine did not help prevent COVID-19 infections when used as pre-exposure prophylaxis.

British researchers are studying whether the drug is effective when used for prevention. 10,000 National Health Service (NHS) workers, along with 30,000 additional volunteers from Asia, South America, Africa, and other parts of Europe are participating in the global study. Results are expected by 2021. Known as the COPCOV trial, led by researchers at the University of Oxford - it was halted in 2021 after evidence came forward that hydroxychloroquine was not effective at either preventing COVID-19 or treating it. Several large, prestigious studies found that the drug neither halted infection nor improved outcomes.

== WHO trial ==
Due to safety concerns and evidence of heart arrhythmias leading to higher death rates, the WHO suspended the hydroxychloroquine arm of the multinational Solidarity trial in May 2020. The WHO had enrolled 3,500 patients from 17 countries in the Solidarity trial. The research surrounding this suspension, provided by a company called Surgisphere based in Chicago, came into question due to errors in the underlying data set. The authors of the study corrected errors in the data later but initially remained firm on their conclusions. Subsequently, a retraction of the study by three of its authors was published by The Lancet on 4 June 2020. The authors stated that their reason behind the retraction was because Surgisphere had failed to cooperate with an independent review of the data used for the study by not allowing any such review to take place.

The WHO decided to resume the trial on 3 June, after reviewing the safety concerns which had been raised. Speaking at a press briefing, WHO's director-general, Tedros Adhanom Ghebreyesus stated that the board had reviewed the available mortality data and had found "no reasons to modify the trial".

On 4 July, the WHO discontinued the hydroxychloroquine trial based on evidence presented at the July WHO Summit on COVID-19 research and innovation. The WHO stated that "These interim trial results show that hydroxychloroquine and lopinavir/ritonavir produce little or no reduction in the mortality of hospitalized COVID-19 patients when compared to standard of care."

== See also ==
- COVID-19 drug repurposing research
- Didier Raoult § COVID-19
- Ivermectin during the COVID-19 pandemic
- RECOVERY Trial § Hydroxychloroquine
- Surgisphere § COVID-19
- Trump administration communication during the COVID-19 pandemic § Chloroquine and hydroxychloroquine
