= Heart Failure Society of America =

American heart disease organization

- Abbreviation: HFSA
- Formation: 1995
- Purpose: To reduce the burden of heart failure
- President: Randall C. Starling (2018)

The Heart Failure Society of America is an American organization of heart failure experts who have an interest in heart function and heart failure. Founded in 1995, it provides a forum for experts and patients with the aim of reducing the burden of heart failure. It has produced advice on categorizing heart failure and it produces guidelines including the 2010 comprehensive heart failure practice guidelines when Douglas L. Mann was served as the president and the 2013 Guideline for the Management of Heart Failure. In 2018, a forum was created with people of various stages of advanced heart failure and specialists in cardiology. Past presidents have included Mandeep R. Mehra, who took up the position in 2016.
