= Sapan Desai =

American physician (born1979)

Sapan S. Desai
- Born: April 6, 1979 (age 47); Evanston, Illinois, United States
- Known for: Surgisphere
- Scientific career
- Fields: Medicine

Sapan Sharankishor Desai (born April 6, 1979) is an American ex-physician, and the owner of Surgisphere, originally a textbook marketing company that claimed to provide large sets of medical data on COVID-19 patients. This data and the research using it has been discredited, and two papers Desai co-authored that used this data were retracted after being published in prominent medical journals.

== Early life and education ==
Desai was born and raised in the North Shore (Chicago) region of Illinois by Gujarati immigrants from India. He is a graduate of the Stevenson High School (Lincolnshire, Illinois) and took 13 Advanced Placement classes there. Desai attended the University of Illinois at Chicago and studied biology, graduating at age 19. He then joined the combined M.D./Ph.D. program at the University of Illinois College of Medicine. During this time, he completed his Ph.D. degree in anatomy and cell biology, and M.D. degree by age 27. His doctoral adviser said that Desai claimed to be enrolled at John Marshall Law School, and later described himself as having his J.D., but there is no evidence of this being true. A 2004 publication from his period in Chicago showed signs of data manipulation (numerous duplicated regions in photographs), upon re-examination in June 2020.

He graduated in 2006, then matched to Duke University for residency as a general surgeon. In 2008 Desai, still a surgical resident, founded Surgisphere to market medical textbooks, produced by Surgisphere, to medical students. Fake 5-star reviews on Amazon from accounts impersonating physicians were found. The Guardian noted that "in 2010, his Wikipedia page was flagged for deletion" because editors questioned his accomplishments. The New York Times described him as an unreliable physician, and a chief resident from Duke said "You couldn't trust what he said. You would verify everything that he did and take everything he did with a grain of salt." Thirteen people interviewed by The New York Times said there were "broad concerns inside the surgery department" about Desai. He would make improbable claims about patients and wouldn't follow through on their care.

Desai received his online M.B.A. degree in 2012 from Western Governors University in three months.

== Career and further controversy ==
In 2012, Desai became a fellow in vascular surgery at the University of Texas Health Science Center at Houston. He published the Journal of Surgical Radiology, which closed in 2013 despite reportedly having accrued 50,000 subscribers, because he "ran out of time." The New York Times described his performance at the Texas hospital as problematic and having "antagonized some supervisors" to the point that they asked for him to be expelled, but he passed the program. Hazim Safi, the department chair, said "I intervened and he graduated", attributing the problems to personality, not skill. From July 2014 to May 2016, Desai was a vascular surgeon at Southern Illinois University School of Medicine in charge of surgical simulation as vice chair of research.

In February 2020, Desai resigned from Northwest Community Hospital in suburban Arlington Heights, Illinois "for family reasons"; at least four medical malpractice suits had been filed against him.

On June 4, 2020, in response to the fraud found after the scrutiny of Surgisphere, its data, and after Surgisphere's inability to convince critics of their data's integrity, Desai joined his coauthors in retracting a paper from the New England Journal of Medicine. The next day the three coauthors of another paper based on findings from Surgisphere data and published in The Lancet retracted the paper without Desai. Richard Horton, editor in chief of The Lancet, called the paper a fabrication and "a monumental fraud". Eric Rubin, editor in chief of The New England Journal of Medicine, said "We shouldn’t have published this". In late July 2020, The New York Times said people "described him as a man in a hurry, a former whiz kid willing to cut corners, misrepresent information or embellish his credentials as he pursued his ambitions." The Lancet later revised its peer review procedures citing problems caused by Surgisphere's "alleged dataset".

Subsequently, Elisabeth Bik analyzed one of Desai's early first author papers and found evidence of apparent image manipulation.

== Personal life ==
Desai is brother-in-law to his co-author, physician Amit Patel.
