= Journal of Cardiovascular Nursing =

- Discipline: Cardiac nursing
- Language: English
- Edited by: Barbara Riegel, Debra K. Moser

Publication details
- History: 1986-present
- Publisher: Lippincott Williams & Wilkins
- Frequency: Bimonthly
- Impact factor: 1.533 (2010)

Standard abbreviations
- ISO 4: J. Cardiovasc. Nurs.

Indexing
- ISSN: 0889-4655 (print); 1550-5049 (web)

Links
- Journal homepage; Online access; Online archive

The Journal of Cardiovascular Nursing is a bimonthly peer-reviewed nursing journal covering cardiac nursing. It is published by Lippincott Williams & Wilkins and was established in 1986, with Barbara Riegel as its founding editor-in-chief. It is the official journal of the Preventive Cardiovascular Nurses Association and its current editor-in-chief is Debra K. Moser (University of Kentucky).

== Abstracting and indexing ==
The journal is abstracted and indexed in:

- CINAHL
- EBSCO databases
- Embase
- MEDLINE/PubMed
- ProQuest databases
- PsycINFO
- Science Citation Index Expanded
- Scopus
- Social Sciences Citation Index

According to the Journal Citation Reports, the journal has a 2017 impact factor of 2.097.

== See also ==
- List of nursing journals
