= William Hurwitz =

American physician

William E. Hurwitz, M.D., is a former Virginia-based pain management physician who was prosecuted and convicted by the United States Government in 2004 for excessively prescribing addictive opioid pain medication to patients, some of whom subsequently abused and redistributed their medications on the black market. Before his conviction, Hurwitz had a series of running battles with the Virginia Board of Medicine which, in 2003 found fault with some of his prescriptions but also held that all were written "in good faith".

William E. Hurwitz is a graduate of Columbia College. He then spent a period at the Harvard University School of Education before attending Stanford University's Medical School. While at Stanford he also earned a Masters in Sociology. He served as a staff physician in Brazil with the Peace Corps upon completing his medical degree.

== Conviction in first trial ==
In 2004, Hurwitz was convicted of over 50 counts of distribution of narcotics originally sentenced to four 25-year sentences and forty-six 15-year sentences, all of which were to be served concurrently, and was fined $2 million (U.S.). During the prosecution of the first case, all of Hurwitz's property was seized.

Hurwitz maintains that he was duped by his patients, and that the enforcement tactics being applied in the war on drugs unfairly target law-abiding doctors, leading to a situation where doctors must choose between providing compassionate care and accepting personal liability for what their patients do with prescribed medications.

His case has potentially serious ramifications among all practitioners of pain medicine, and is considered by many to be a drastic example of the overreach of anti-drug law enforcement efforts.

== Conviction overturned on appeal ==
His conviction was overturned by the U.S. Court of Appeals for the Fourth Circuit on August 22, 2006, due to errors by the trial judge that essentially prevented the jury from considering Hurwitz's defense — that he was prescribing the medication in good faith as part of the regular practice of medicine. Defended pro bono, his re-trial began on March 26, 2007 in federal district court for the Eastern District of Virginia.

== Conviction in second trial ==
On April 27, 2007 jurors found William E. Hurwitz guilty of 16 counts of drug trafficking and determined that he prescribed massive quantities of medicine to patients in chronic pain. The 12-member jury acquitted Hurwitz on 17 other trafficking counts. District Judge Leonie Brinkema dismissed the remaining 12 counts. His two lead trial attorneys for the second trial were Lawrence Robbins and Richard Sauber, of Robbins, Russell, Englert, Orseck & Untereiner, and Fried, Frank, Harris, Shriver & Jacobson, respectively.

On July 13, 2007 Judge Brinkema sentenced Hurwitz to four years and nine months. The judge said that most of Hurwitz's practice was legitimate medicine that saved patients' lives and that medical literature increasingly supports his theories on the propriety of massive drug doses to treat patients in chronic pain. "An increasing body of respectable medical literature and expertise supports those types of high-dosage, opioid medications," the judge said.

The judge added that Hurwitz had undermined his own cause by ignoring that some patients were clearly drug dealers and Hurwitz admitted before sentencing that he had deceived himself about some patients who in retrospect were clearly criminals.

Hurwitz was imprisoned a total of four years and eight months. He then moved to Charlotte, North Carolina.
