= Douglas L. Mann =

American physician

Douglas L.Mann
- Education: Lafayette College; Temple University
- Scientific career
- Workplaces: Washington University
- Website: cardiology.wustl.edu/faculty/douglas-l-mann/

Douglas Lowell Mann is an American cardiologist and medical researcher. He is the Ada L. Steininger Professor of Cardiology and Professor of Medicine, Cell Biology and Physiology at Washington University School of Medicine in St. Louis, Missouri. His research focuses on inflammatory mediators, innate immune signaling, and cardiac remodeling.

He served as principal investigator in clinical trials, including RENAISSANCE, RENEWAL, the Acorn Pivotal Trial, INOVATE-HF and the LIFE trial.

== Education ==
Mann received a Bachelor of Arts degree in biology from Lafayette College in 1974 and a Doctor of Medicine degree from Temple University School of Medicine in 1979. He completed an internship and residency in medicine at Temple University Hospital from 1979 to 1982. He completed his cardiology fellowship at the University of California, San Diego.

He was a clinical and research fellow at the Massachusetts General Hospital and a research fellow in cardiology at Temple University Hospital.

== Career ==
Mann joined the faculty of the Medical University of South Carolina in 1986 as an assistant professor of medicine. He later joined Baylor College of Medicine in 1991.

At Baylor, Mann became professor of medicine in 1996 and served as chief of the Section of Cardiology at the Michael E. DeBakey VA Medical Center from 1991 to 2000. From 1998 to 2009, he directed the Winters Center for Heart Failure Research, and in 2005 became the chief of the Section of Cardiology at Baylor College of Medicine and the Texas Heart Institute at St. Luke's Hospital in Houston.

In 2009, Mann joined Washington University School of Medicine in St. Louis as chief of the Division of Cardiology,the Lewin Distinguished Professor of Cardiovascular Disease and professor of medicine, cell biology and physiology. He remained chief of the cardiovascular division until 2019.

Since 2019, he has held the Ada L. Steininger Professorship of Cardiology and currently serves as Professor of Medicine, Cell Biology and Physiology at Washington University School of Medicine.

From 2015 to 2025, Mann was the founding editor-in-chief of JACC: Basic to Translational Science.

== Research ==
Mann's early studies investigated the effects of tumor necrosis factor (TNF) on cardiac muscle cells and helped establish inflammatory signaling as a mechanistic contributor to cardiac dysfunction and remodeling rather than solely a marker of disease severity. His laboratory subsequently investigated TNF receptors and downstream signaling pathways in cardiac myocytes. This work included studies of TNF receptor-associated factor 2 (TRAF2) and its role in cytoprotective signaling.

His group reported differences between embryonically derived resident cardiac macrophages and monocyte-derived macrophages, with distinct effects on cardiac recovery and adverse remodeling.

His more recent work has used transcriptomic, network-based, and systems-level approaches to study interactions between inflammatory, metabolic, fibrotic, and stress-response pathways in heart failure.

The American College of Cardiology has described him as a physician-scientist whose work has connected studies of innate immunity and heart failure with phase II and phase III clinical trials.

== Awards and honors ==
Mann is an elected member of the American Society for Clinical Investigation, the American Association of Physicians, the Association of University Cardiologists, and the American Clinical and Climatological Association.

He has received numerous awards including the Michael E. DeBakey award for excellence in research, the Distinguished Mentor Award, American College of Cardiology, and the 2019 Lifetime achievement award from the Heart Failure Society of America.

In 2020, he received the lifetime achievement award from the European Heart Failure Association and was elected a Fellow of the American Association for the Advancement of Science.

He is the past president of the Heart Failure Society and the Medical Alumnus of the Year award from Temple University School of Medicine. He was recognized by Forbes magazine as one of the top 27 cardiologists in the United States.

== Selected publications ==
- Yokoyama T, Vaca L, Rossen RD, Durante W, Hazarika P, Mann DL. "Cellular basis for the negative inotropic effects of tumor necrosis factor-alpha in the adult mammalian heart." Journal of Clinical Investigation. 1993;92(5):2303–2312.
- Torre-Amione G, Kapadia S, Benedict C, Oral H, Young JB, Mann DL. "Proinflammatory cytokine levels in patients with depressed left ventricular ejection fraction: a report from the Studies of Left Ventricular Dysfunction (SOLVD)." Journal of the American College of Cardiology. 1996;27(5):1201–1206.
- Mann DL, McMurray JJV, Packer M, et al. "Targeted anticytokine therapy in patients with chronic heart failure: results of the Randomized Etanercept Worldwide Evaluation (RENEWAL)." Circulation. 2004;109(13):1594–1602.
- Epelman S, Lavine KJ, Beaudin AE, et al. "Embryonic and adult-derived resident cardiac macrophages are maintained through distinct mechanisms at steady state and during inflammation." Immunity. 2014;40(1):91–104.
- Lavine KJ, Epelman S, Uchida K, et al. "Distinct macrophage lineages contribute to disparate patterns of cardiac recovery and remodeling in the neonatal and adult heart." Proceedings of the National Academy of Sciences. 2014;111(45):16029–16034.
- Mann DL. The Emerging Field of Cardioimmunology: Past, Present and Foreseeable Future. Circ Res. 2024;134:1663–1680
