= Eric Rubin =

American microbiologist (born 1958)

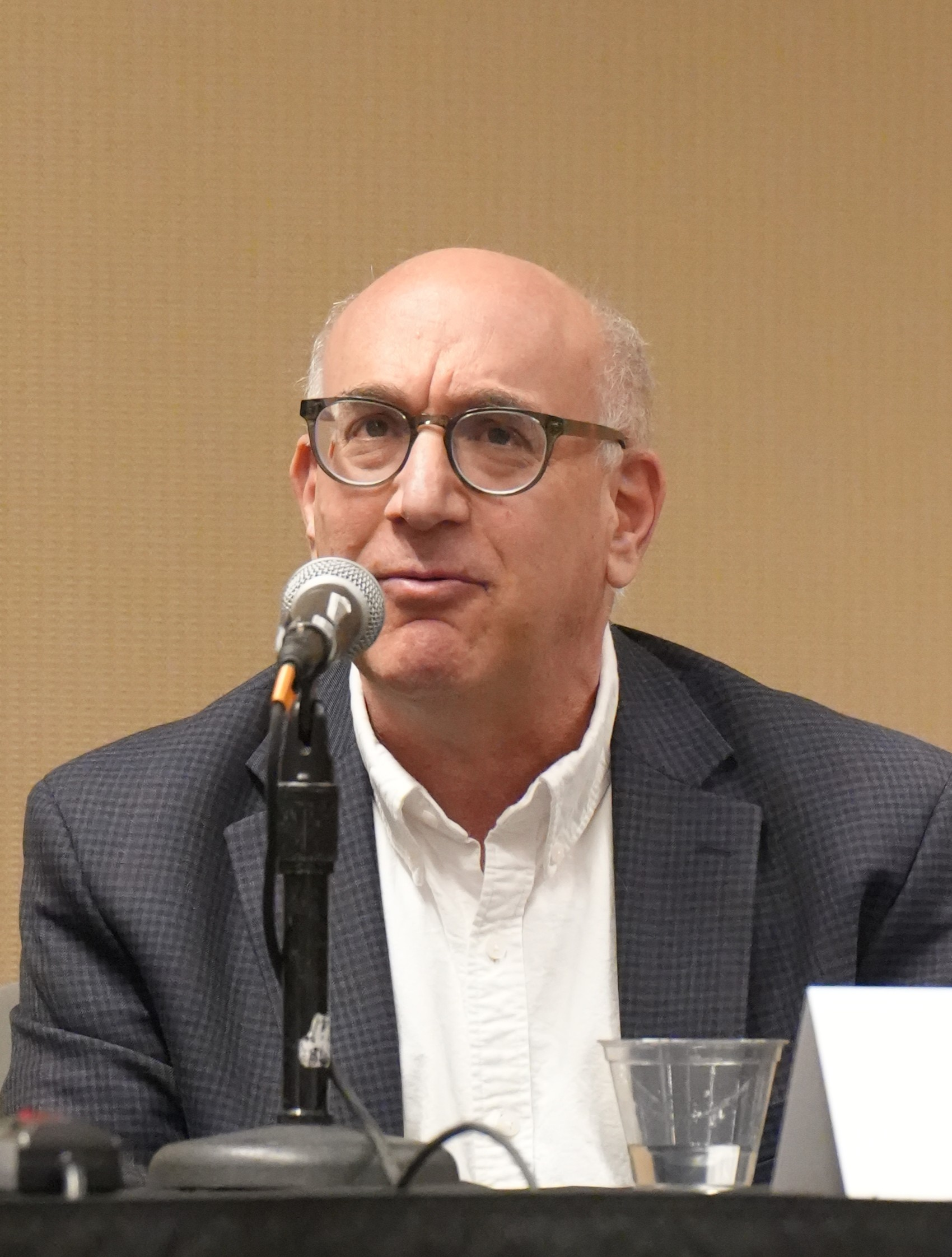
Eric Rubin, professor of medicine at Harvard Medical School, at AAAS2026

Eric Joseph Rubin (born 1958) is an American microbiologist, and infectious disease specialist. He is a professor of medicine at Harvard Medical School, an adjunct professor of immunology and infectious diseases at the Harvard T.H. Chan School of Public Health and the editor-in-chief of the New England Journal of Medicine and NEJM Group.

== Personal life ==
Rubin was born and raised in Brockton, Massachusetts. His father, Morris Rubin, was a salesman and his mother, Paula (Schechet) Rubin, was a school librarian. He is married to Akiyo Fujii and has two children, Alexander and Daniel.

== Education and career ==
Rubin graduated from Brockton High School, Harvard College (AB, 1980) and Tufts University (MD and PhD, 1990). As a graduate student he studied the mechanism of action of botulinum toxins with Dr. Michael Gill. Rubin trained in internal medicine and infectious disease at the Massachusetts General Hospital and went on to postdoctoral work in John Mekalanos lab at Harvard Medical School. There he studied Vibrio cholerae, Haemophilus influenzae and Mycobacterium smegmatis. His postdoctoral work included collaborating on the development of a widely used transposition system based on the Himar1 transposon along with the methods for mapping mutations on a genome-wide basis.

Rubin joined the Department of Immunology and Infectious Diseases at the Harvard T.H. Chan School of Public Health in 1999, eventually becoming the Irene Heinz Given Professor and Chair of the Department. His lab studies mycobacterial physiology and virulence and has developed many of the genetic tools used to study Mycobacterium tuberculosis and related organisms. With collaborators, the lab has used these tools to address a wide range of questions about tuberculosis pathogenesis, non-tuberculous mycobacteria, and drug and vaccine development. He is also an infectious disease clinician who sees patients at Brigham and Women’s Hospital, where he is an associate physician.

In 2019, Rubin was appointed editor-in-chief of the journal, where he had previously served as an associate editor, and NEJM Group, the publishing division of the Massachusetts Medical Society. During the COVID-19 outbreak, the journal added a weekly podcast and rapidly published many studies, including the first description of SARS-CoV-2, the causative virus. Under his editorial leadership, NEJM Group launched NEJM Evidence (2022) and NEJM AI (2023), a monthly journal that explores cutting-edge applications of artificial intelligence and machine learning in clinical medicine. He also oversees NEJM Catalyst Innovations in Care Delivery and NEJM Clinician, which launched in December 2025.

Rubin has worked extensively in international settings and has been involved on advisory boards for several national and global organizations. He is a member of the American Academy of Microbiology, the American Association of Physicians, and the National Academy of Medicine. He also serves on the Food and Drug Administration’s Vaccines and Related Biological Products Advisory Committee (VRBPAC).

== Bibliography ==
- "Eric Rubin, MD, PhD". Brigham and Women's Hospital Physician Directory. Brigham and Women's Hospital.
- "Eric Rubin". Harvard T.H. Chan School of Public Health. Harvard University.
- "Eric J. Rubin, MD, PhD, Named Editor-in-Chief of the New England Journal of Medicine and NEJM Group" (Press release). PR Newswire. June 12, 2019.
- "Brockton native named editor-in-chief of New England Journal of Medicine". The Enterprise. Gannett. June 23, 2019.
- "Vaccines and Related Biological Products Advisory Committee October 14-15, 2021 Meeting Roster". U.S. Food and Drug Administration. U.S. Department of Health and Human Services. October 14, 2021.
- "Eric J. Rubin, MD, PhD". Mass General Brigham.
- "Alumni". Mekalanos Lab. Harvard Medical School.
- "Vaccines and Related Biological Products Advisory Committee October 14-15, 2021 Meeting Roster". U.S. Food and Drug Administration. U.S. Department of Health and Human Services.
- US 6368830, "Attenuated Streptococcus pneumoniae strain", issued April 9, 2002
- "Scientist at Work, Scientist at Play". Harvard T.H. Chan School of Public Health. Harvard University. October 1, 2019.
- "Rubin Lab". Harvard T.H. Chan School of Public Health. Harvard University. June 29, 2024.
- "Eric Rubin, MD, PhD". Brigham and Women's Hospital Physician Directory. Brigham and Women's Hospital.
- "Eric J. Rubin, MD, PhD, Named Editor-in-Chief of the New England Journal of Medicine and NEJM Group" (Press release). PR Newswire. June 12, 2019.
- "First Authorizing Statement from NEJM on COVID-19". The New England Journal of Medicine. Massachusetts Medical Society. March 30, 2020. doi:10.1056/NEJMdo200326 (inactive October 6, 2025).
- "Covid-19 — Reassessing the Risks to Health Care Workers". The New England Journal of Medicine. Massachusetts Medical Society. March 17, 2020. doi:10.1056/NEJMc2004794.
- Sacks, C. A.; Hardin, C. C.; Normand, S. L.; Kadire, S.; Takvorian, K.; Galloway, N.; Linga, R.; Hannon, P.; Drazen, J.; Rubin, E. (December 22, 2021). "COVID-19 — A Year of Uncertainty and Hope". The New England Journal of Medicine. 386 (2). Massachusetts Medical Society: 182–183. doi:10.1056/NEJMe2118588. PMID 35007414.
- "NEJM Launches New Journal Focused on Artificial Intelligence in Medicine". STAT News. STAT. December 11, 2023.
- "Vaccines and Related Biological Products Advisory Committee October 14-15, 2021 Meeting Roster". U.S. Food and Drug Administration. U.S. Department of Health and Human Services. October 14, 2021.
- "Roster for Vaccines and Related Biological Products Advisory Committee". U.S. Food and Drug Administration. U.S. Department of Health and Human Services.
