= Urine test strip =

Diagnostic tool used in urinalysis

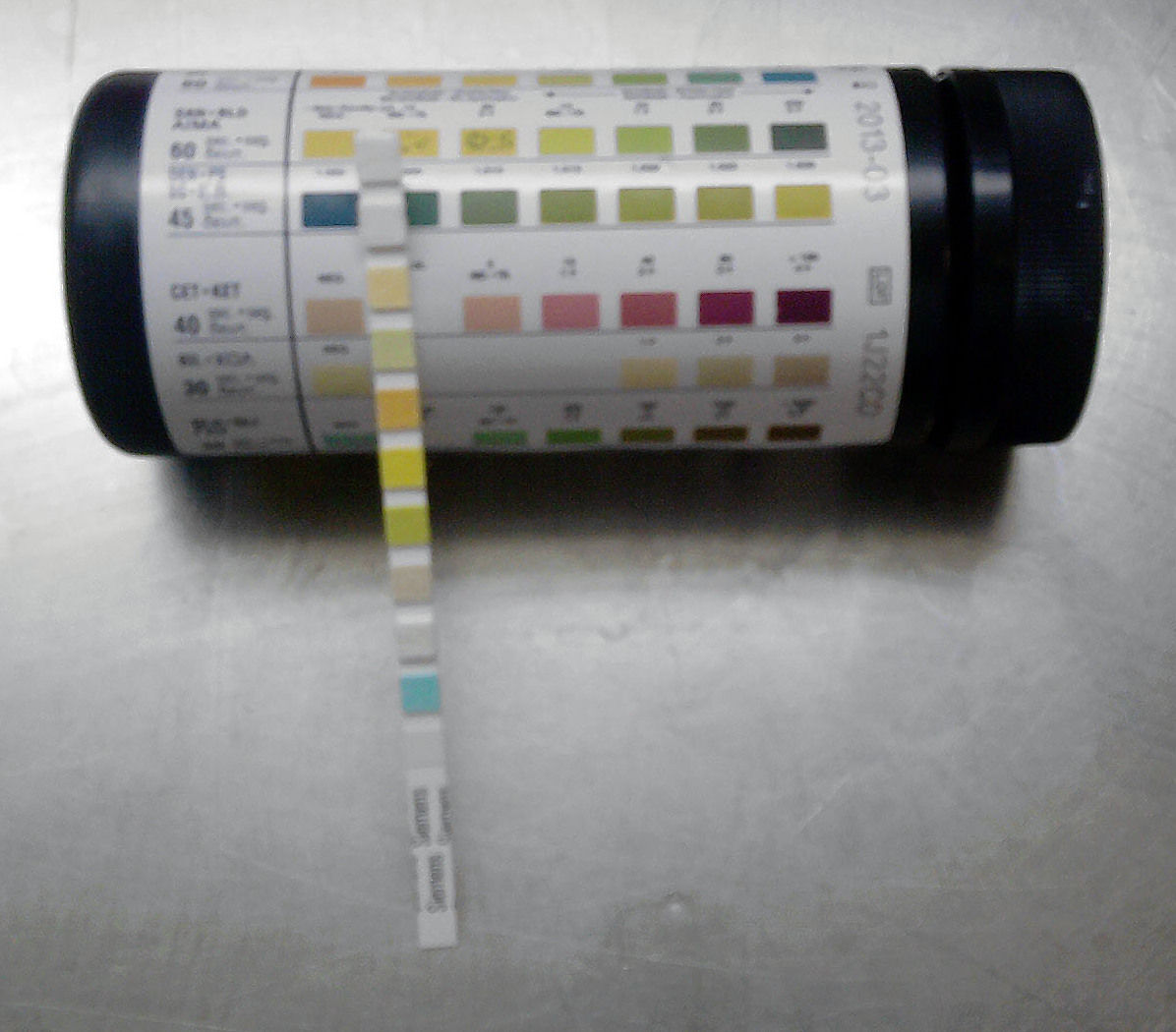
- The Multistix urine test strip showing the manufacturer's coloured scale.
- Purpose: determine pathological changes

A urine test strip or dipstick is a basic diagnostic tool used to determine pathological changes in a patient's urine in standard urinalysis.

Urine test strip
Leukocytes
Nitrite
Urobilinogen
Protein
pH
Haemoglobin
Specific gravity
Ketone
Bilirubin
Glucose

A standard urine test strip may comprise up to 10 different chemical pads or reagents which react (change color) when immersed in, and then removed from, a urine sample. The test can often be read in as little as 60 to 120 seconds after dipping, although certain tests require longer. Routine testing of the urine with multiparameter strips is the first step in the diagnosis of a wide range of diseases. The analysis includes testing for the presence of proteins, glucose, ketones, haemoglobin, bilirubin, urobilinogen, acetone, nitrite and leucocytes as well as testing of pH and specific gravity or to test for infection by different pathogens.

The test strips consist of a ribbon made of plastic or paper of about 5 millimetre wide. Plastic strips have pads impregnated with chemicals that react with the compounds present in urine producing a characteristic colour. For the paper strips the reactants are absorbed directly onto the paper. Paper strips are often specific to a single reaction (e.g. pH measurement), while the strips with pads allow several determinations simultaneously.

There are strips which serve different purposes, such as qualitative strips that only determine if the sample is positive or negative, or there are semi-quantitative ones that in addition to providing a positive or negative reaction also provide an estimation of a quantitative result, in the latter the colour reactions are approximately proportional to the concentration of the substance being tested for in the sample. The reading of the results is carried out by comparing the pad colours with a colour scale provided by the manufacturer, no additional equipment is needed.

This type of analysis is very common in the control and monitoring of diabetic patients. The time taken for the appearance of the test results on the strip can vary from a few minutes after the test to 30 minutes after immersion of the strip in the urine (depending on the brand of product being used).

Semi-quantitative values are usually reported as: trace, 1+, 2+, 3+ and 4+; although tests can also be estimated as milligrams per decilitre. Automated readers of test strips also provide results using units from the International System of Units.

== Test method ==
The test method consists of immersing the test strip completely in a well mixed sample of urine for a short period of time, then extracting it from the container and supporting the edge of the strip over the mouth of the container to remove excess urine. The strip is then left to stand for the time necessary for the reactions to occur (usually 1 to 2 minutes), and finally the colours that appear are compared against the chromatic scale provided by the manufacturer.

An improper technique can produce false results, for example, leukocytes and erythrocytes precipitate at the bottom of the container and may not be detected if the sample is not properly mixed, and in the same way, if an excess of urine remains on the strip after it has been removed from the test sample, may cause the reagents to leak from the pads onto adjacent pads resulting in mixing and distortion of the colours. To ensure that this does not occur it is recommended the edges of the strip are dried on absorbent paper.

== Reactions for generalised tests ==
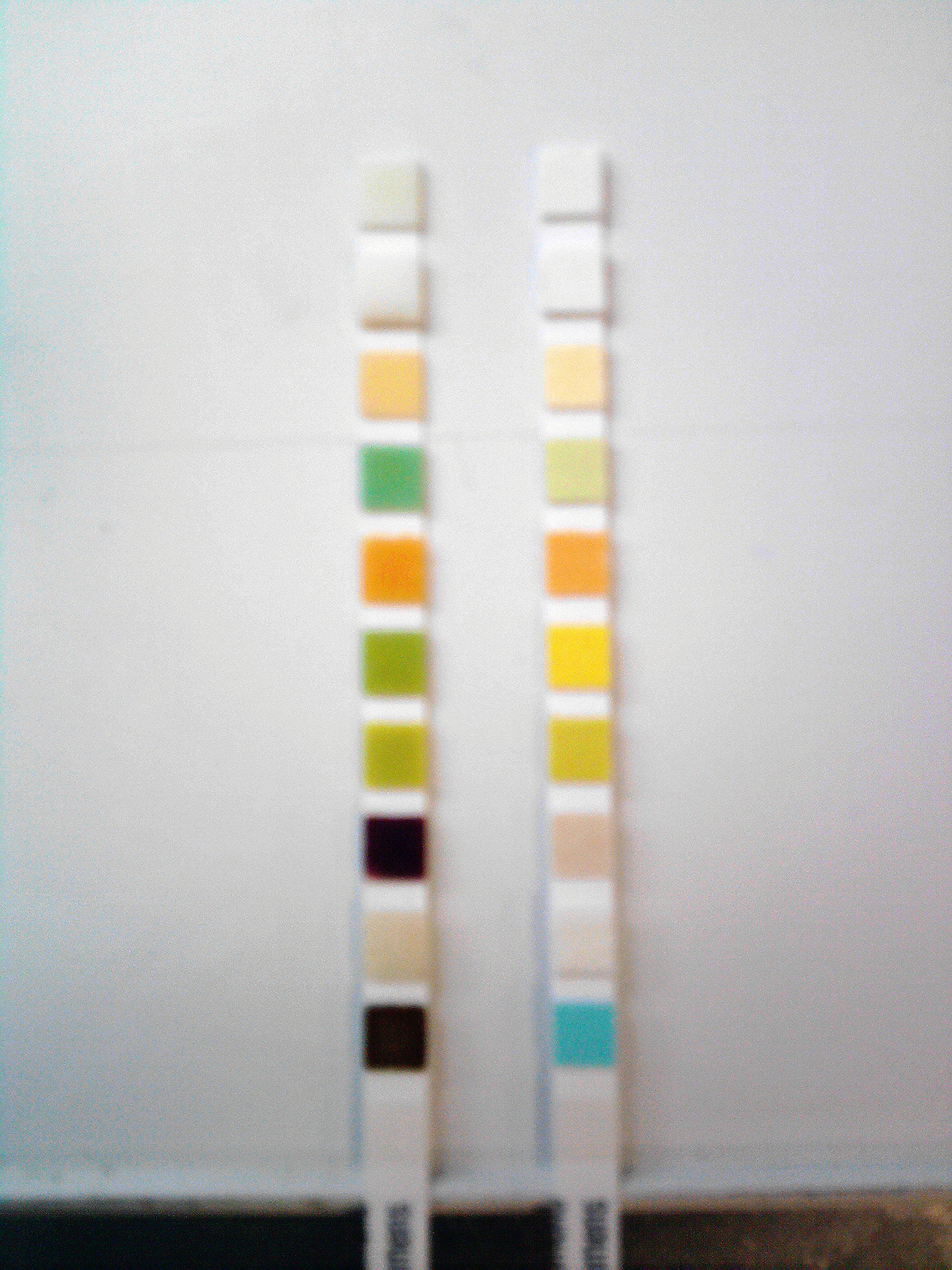
Comparison between two reactive strips, one pathological (to the left, from a patient with uncontrolled diabetes mellitus), and an unreacted strip. From top to bottom the pathological strip shows: Leukocytes (-), nitrites (-), urobilinogen (-), proteins (+), pH (5), hemoglobin (+), specific gravity (1.025), ketones (++++), bilirubin (+), glucose (+++).

=== pH ===
The lungs and kidneys are the main regulators of an organism's acid / alkali balance. The balance is maintained through the controlled excretion of acidic hydrogens in the form of ammonia ions, monohydrogenated phosphate, weak organic acids and through the reabsorption of bicarbonate through glomerular filtration in the convoluted tubules of the nephron. The pH of urine normally vary between 4.5 and 8 with the first urine produced in the morning generally being more acidic and the urine produced after meals generally more alkaline. Normal reference values are not provided for urine pH as the variation is too wide and results have to be considered in the context of the other quantifiable parameters.

The determination of urinary pH has two main objectives, one is diagnostic and the other is therapeutic. On the one hand it provides information regarding the balance between acid and alkali in a patient and allows identification of the substances that are present in the urine in crystalline form. On the other hand, certain illnesses require a patient to keep the pH of their urine within given narrow margins, whether to promote the elimination of chemotherapeutic agents, avoid the precipitation of salts that promote the formation of kidney stones, or in order to facilitate the control of a urinary infection. Regulating diet mainly controls urinary pH, although using medication can also control it. Diets rich in animal proteins tend to produce acidic urine, while diets mainly composed of vegetables tend to produce alkali urine.

Commercial brands measure pH in increments of 0.5 or 1 pH units between pH 5 and 9. In order to differentiate pH in this wide range it is common to use a double indicator system comprising methyl red and bromothymol blue. Methyl red produces a colour change from red to yellow in the range of pH 4 to 6 and the bromothymol blue changes from yellow to blue between pH 6 and 9. In the range 5 to 9 the strips show colours that change from orange at pH 5, passing through yellow and green to dark blue at pH 9.

=== Specific gravity ===
One of the kidneys' important functions is to reabsorb water after glomerular filtration. The complex process of reabsorption is usually one of the first renal functions to be affected by disease. The specific gravity of urine is a measure of its density compared to H_{2}O and depends on the quantity and density of solutes (molecules with more mass per volume increase measure of specific gravity). The measurement of specific gravity should not be confused with the measurement of osmotic concentration, which is more related to the number of particles than with their mass.

The urine test strip test for specific gravity is based on the change in dissociation constant (pK_{a}) of an anionic polyelectrolyte (poly-(methyl vinyl ether/maleic anhydride)) in an alkali medium that is ionised and releases hydrogen ions in proportion to the number of cations present in the solution. The greater the cation concentration of the urine the more hydrogen ions are released, thereby reducing the pH. The pad also includes bromothymol blue, which measures this change in pH. It should be remembered that the test strip only measures cation concentration, it is therefore possible that urine with a high concentration of non-ionic solutes (such as glucose or urea) or with high molecular weight compounds (such as the media used to provide radiographic contrast) will yield a result that will be erroneously lower than that measured by densitometry. The colours vary from dark blue with a reading of 1.000 to yellow for a reading of 1.030.

1. In an alkaline medium
  Polyelectrolyte-H_{n} + Cations^{n+} → Polyelectrolyte-Cations + nH^{+}
2. In an alkaline medium
  H^{+} + Bromothymol blue_{(Blue)} → Bromothymol blue-H^{+}_{(Yellow)}

Elevated protein concentrations produce slightly elevated specific density results as a consequence of the indicator's protein error; in addition, samples with a pH above 6.5 give lower readings as a result of the indicator's bias. For this reason the manufacturers recommend that 5 units are added to the specific gravity reading when the pH is greater than 6.5.

=== Blood ===
Blood may be present in the urine either in the form of intact red blood cells (hematuria) or as the product of red blood cell destruction, hemoglobin (hemoglobinuria). Blood present in large quantities can be detected visually. Hematuria produces cloudy red urine, and hemoglobinuria appears as a clear red specimen. Any amount of blood greater than five cells per microliter of urine is considered clinically significant; visual examination cannot be relied upon to detect the presence of blood. Microscopic examination of the urinary sediment shows intact red blood cells, but free hemoglobin produced either by hemolytic disorders or lysis of red blood cells is not detected. Therefore, chemical tests for hemoglobin provide the most accurate mean for determining the presence of blood. Once blood has been detected, the microscopic examination can be used to differentiate between hematuria and hemoglobinuria.

Chemical tests for blood use the pseudoperoxidase activity of hemoglobin to catalyze a reaction between the heme component of both hemoglobin and myoglobin and the chromogen (a substance that acquires colour after a chemical reaction) tetramethylbenzidine to produce an oxidized chromogen, which has a green-blue colour. Reagent strip manufacturers incorporate peroxide, and tetramethylbenzidine, into the blood testing area. Two colour charts are provided that correspond to the reactions that occur with hemoglobinuria, myoglobinuria and hematuria (RBCs). In the presence of free hemoglobin/myoglobin, uniform colour ranging from a negative yellow through green to a strongly positive green-blue appears on the pad. In contrast, intact red blood cells are lysed when they come in contact with the pad, and the liberated hemoglobin produces an isolated reaction that results in a speckled pattern on the pad. Reagent strip tests can detect concentrations as low as five red blood cells per microliter; however, care must be taken when comparing these figures with the actual microscopic values, because the absorbent nature of the pad attracts some of urine. The terms trace, small, moderate, and large (or trace, 1+, 2+, and 3+) are used for reporting.

False-positive reactions due to menstrual contamination may be seen. They also occur if strong oxidizing detergents are present in the specimen container. Vegetable peroxidase and bacterial enzymes, including an Escherichia coli peroxidase, may also cause false-positive reactions. Therefore, sediments containing bacteria should be checked closely for the presence of red blood cells. Traditionally, ascorbic acid (vitamin C) has been associated with false-negative reagent strip reactions for blood. Both Multistix and Chemstrip have modified their reagent strips to reduce this interference to very high levels of ascorbic acid, and Chemstrip overlays the reagent pad with an iodate-impregnated mesh that oxidizes the ascorbic acid prior to its reaching the reaction pad. False-negative reactions can result when urine with a high specific gravity contains crenated red blood cells that do not lyse when they come in contact with the reagent pad. Decreased reactivity may also be seen when formalin is used as a preservative or when the hypertension medication captopril or high concentration of nitrite are present. Red blood cells settle to the bottom of the specimen container, and failure to mix the specimen prior to testing causes a falsely decreased reading.

== Diseases identified ==
With the aid of routine examinations early symptoms of the following four groups can be identified:

- Diseases of the kidneys and the urinary tract
- Carbohydrate metabolism disorders (diabetes mellitus)
- Liver diseases and haemolytic disorders
- Urinary infections

=== Urinary tract ===
Screening parameters: Many renal and urinary tract diseases may be asymptomatic for a long period of time. Routine urinalysis is recommended as a basic yet fundamental step in identifying renal damage and/or urinary tract disease at an early stage, especially in high-risk populations such as diabetics, the hypertensive, African Americans, Polynesians, and those with a family history.

Specific kidney and urinary tract diseases that can be identified include: chronic kidney disease, glomerulonephritis, proteinuria and haematuria.

==== Protein testing ====
Of the routine chemical tests performed on urine, the most indicative of renal disease is the protein determination. Proteinuria is often associated with early renal disease, making the urinary protein test an important part of any physical examination. Normal urine contains very little protein, usually less than 100–300 mg/L or 100 mg per 24 hours is excreted. This protein consists primarily of low-molecular-weight serum proteins that have been filtered by the glomerulus and proteins produced in the genitourinary tract. Due to its low molecular weight, albumin is the major serum protein found in the plasma, the normal urinary albumin content is low because the majority of albumin presented in the glomerulus is not filtered, and much of the filtered albumin is reabsorbed by the tubules. Other proteins include small amounts of serum and tubular microglobulins. Uromodulin produced by the renal tubular epithelial cells and proteins from prostatic, seminal, and vaginal secretions. Uromodulin is routinely produced in the distal convoluted tube, and forms the matrix of casts.

Traditional reagent strip testing for protein uses the principle of the protein error of indicators to produce a visible colorimetric reaction. Contrary to the general belief that indicators produce specific colours in response to particular pH levels, certain indicators change colour in the presence of protein even though the pH of the medium remains constant. This is so because protein accepts hydrogen ions from the indicator. The test is more sensitive to albumin because albumin contains more amino groups to accept the hydrogen ions than other proteins. Depending on the manufacturer, the protein area of the strip contains different chemicals. Multistix contains tetrabromophenol blue and Chemstrip contains 3’,3”,5’,5”-tetrachlorophenol, 3,4,5,6-tetrabromosulfonphthalein. Both contain an acid buffer to maintain the pH at a constant level. At a pH level of 3, both indicators appear yellow in the absence of protein. However, as the protein concentration increases, the colour progresses through various shades of green and finally to blue. Readings are reported in terms of negative, trace, 1+, 2+, 3+ and 4+ or the semi-quantitative values of 30, 100, 300 or 2000 mg/dL corresponding to each colour change. Trace values are considered to be less than 30 mg/dL. Interpretation of trace readings can be difficult.

Indicator-H^{+}_{(Yellow)} + Protein → Indicator_{(Blue-green)} + Protein-H^{+}

The major source of error with reagent strips occurs with highly buffered alkaline urine that overrides the acid buffer system, producing a rise in pH and a colour change unrelated to protein concentration. Likewise, a technical error of allowing the reagent pad to remain in contact with the urine for a prolonged period may remove the buffer. False-positive readings are obtained when the reaction does not take place under acidic conditions. Highly pigmented urine and contamination of the container with quaternary ammonium compounds, detergents and antiseptics also cause false-positive readings. A false-positive trace reading may occur in specimens with a high specific gravity.

==== Hemoglobin and myoglobin testing ====
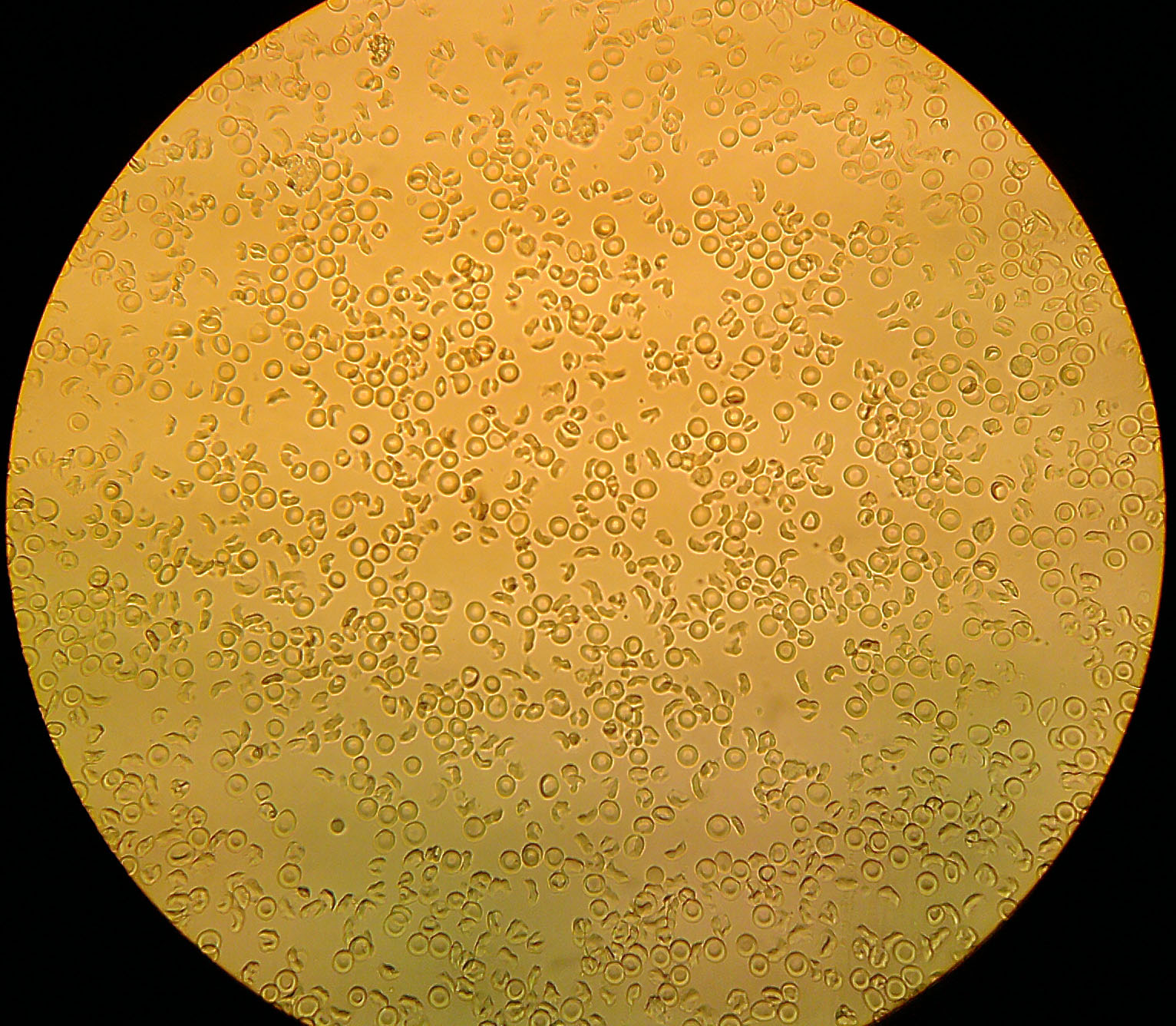
Microphotograph of a macroscopic hematuria, the biconcave form of the red blood cells is clearly visible, it is rare to find examples in such a well conserved condition.

The presence of blood in the urine is, of all the parameters normally tested, the one that is most closely related with traumatic damage to the kidneys or the genitourinary tract. The most common causes of hematuria are: nephrolithiasis, glomerular disease, tumours, pyelonephritis, exposure to nephrotoxins, and treatment with anticoagulants. Non-pathological hematuria can be observed after strenuous exercise and during menstruation. The normal number of red blood cells in urine should not usually exceed 3 per high power field.

A urine test strip showing positive for blood can also indicate hemoglobinuria, which is not detectable using a microscope due to the lysis of red blood cells in the urinary tract (particularly in alkaline or dilute urine), or intravascular hemolysis. Under normal conditions the formation of haptoglobin-hemoglobin complexes prevents glomerular filtration, but if the hemolysis is extensive haptoglobin's uptake capacity is exceeded and hemoglobin can appear in urine. Hemoglobinuria can be caused by hemolytic anaemia, blood transfusions, extensive burns, the bite of the recluse spider (Loxosceles), infections and strenuous exercise.

The urine test strip test for blood is based on hemoglobin's pseudo peroxidase activity in catalysing a reaction between hydrogen peroxide and the chromogen tetramethylbenzidine in order to produce a dark blue oxidation product. the resultant colour can vary between green and dark blue depending on the amount of hemoglobin.

- Catalysed by hemoglobin acting as a peroxidase
  H_{2}O_{2} + Chromogen → Oxidised chromogen (coloured) + H_{2}O
  The reaction is not only catalysed by blood hemoglobin, other globins with a hem group such as myoglobin can also catalyse the same reaction.

The presence of myoglobin in urine gives a positive reaction in the test strip's blood test but the urine appears clear with a red to brown colouration. The presence of myoglobin in place of hemoglobin can be caused by pathologies associated with muscular damage (rhabdomyolysis), such as trauma, crush syndrome, prolonged coma, convulsions, progressive muscular atrophy, alcoholism, heroin abuse and strenuous physical activity.

The haem fraction of these proteins is toxic for the kidney tubules and elevated concentrations can cause acute kidney injury.

It is possible to use an ammonia sulphate precipitation test in order to distinguish between hemoglobinuria and myoglobinuria. This consists of adding 2.8gr of ammonia sulphate to 5 mL of centrifuged urine, mixing well and after 5 minutes filtering the sample and centrifuging again. The hemoglobin precipitates out with the ammonia sulphate but not the myoglobin. Analysis of the supernatant for blood with a test strip will give a positive if myoglobin is present and a negative if hemoglobin is present.

The test can give false positives if strong oxidant or peroxide residues are present on the laboratory material used for the analysis.

=== Carbohydrate disorders ===
- Glucose - Identified as Glycosuria
- Ketones - Identified as Ketonuria (also see ketoacidosis and ketosis)

Around 30–40% of type I diabetics and around 20% of type II diabetics suffer in time from a nephropathy, and early recognition of diabetes is therefore of major significance for the further state of health of these patients.

Specific carbohydrate metabolism disorders able to be identified include diabetes mellitus, glucosuria and ketonuria.

==== Glucose test ====
Under normal conditions nearly all the glucose removed in the glomerulus is reabsorbed in the proximal convoluted tubule. If the blood glucose level increases, as happens in diabetes mellitus, the capacity of the convoluted tubule to reabsorb glucose is exceeded (an effect known as renal reabsorption threshold). For glucose this threshold is between 160–180 mg/dL. Glucose concentrations vary in an individual, and a healthy person can present with transitory glucosuria after a meal high in sugars; therefore the most representative results come from samples obtained at least two hours after food is eaten.

The detection of glucose by test strips is based on the enzymatic reaction of glucose oxidase. This enzyme catalyses the oxidation of glucose by atmospheric oxygen to form gluconic acid and hydrogen peroxide. A second linked reaction, mediated by a peroxidase, catalyses the reaction between the peroxide and a chromogen (a substance that acquires colour after a chemical reaction) to form a coloured compound that indicates the glucose concentration.

- 1) Catalysed by glucose oxidase
  Glucose + O_{2} → D-glucono-δ-lactone + H_{2}O_{2}

- 2) Catalysed by peroxidase
  H_{2}O_{2} + Chromogen → Oxidised chromogen (coloured) + H_{2}O

The reaction is specific for glucose, as occurs in all enzymatic reactions, but it can provide some false positive results due to the presence of traces of strong oxidising agents or peroxide from disinfectants used on laboratory instruments.

==== Ketone test ====
The term ketones or ketone bodies in reality refers to three intermediate products in the metabolism of fatty acids; acetone, acetoacetic acid and beta-hydroxybutyric acid. Elevated concentrations of ketones are not generally found in urine, as all these substances are completely metabolized, producing energy, carbon dioxide and water. However, the disruption of carbohydrate metabolism can lead to metabolic imbalances and the appearance of ketones as a by-product of the metabolism of an organism's fat reserves.

An increase in fat metabolism can be the result of starvation or malabsorption, the inability to metabolize carbohydrates (as occurs, for example, in diabetes) or due to losses from frequent vomiting.

The control of urinary ketone is particularly useful in managing and monitoring diabetes mellitus type 1. Ketonuria indicates an insulin deficiency that indicates the need to regulate its dosage. An increase in the blood concentration of ketone produces a water-electrolyte imbalance, dehydration and if not corrected, acidosis and in the end diabetic coma.

The three ketone compounds appear in different proportions in the urine, although these proportions are relatively constant in different samples as both the acetone and the beta-hydroxybutyric acid are produced from the acetoacetic acid. The proportions are 78% beta-hydroxybutyric acid, 20% acetoacetic acid and 2% acetone.

The test used in the urine test strips is based on the reaction of sodium nitroprusside (nitroferricyanide). In this reaction the acetoacetic acid in an alkali medium reacts with the sodium nitroprusside producing a magenta coloured complex:

- Na_{2}[Fe(CN)_{5}NO] + CH_{3}COCH_{2}COOH + 2Na(OH) → Na_{4}[Fe(CN)_{5}-N=CHCOCH_{2}COOH]_{(magenta)} + H_{2}O
- Sodium nitroprusside + Acetoacetic acid + Alkali medium → Pink-magenta complex + Water

The test does not measure beta-hydroxybutyric acid and it is only weakly sensitive to acetone when glycine is added to the reaction. However, as these compounds are derived from the acetoacetic acid their existence can be assumed and a separate test is not therefore necessary. Those medicines that contain sulfhydryl groups, such as mercaptoethane sulphonate Na (Mesna) and captopril and L-DOPA can give atypical colouring. A false negative can occur in samples that have not been adequately stored due to volatilization and bacterial degradation.

=== Liver and blood disorders ===
In many liver diseases the patients often show signs of pathology only at a late stage. Early diagnosis allows appropriate therapeutic measures to be instituted in good time, avoiding consequential damage and further infections.

Specific liver diseases and haemolytic disorders able to be identified include liver disease, (accompanied by jaundice), cirrhosis, urobilinogenuria and bilirubinuria.

==== Bilirubin test ====
Bilirubin is a highly pigmented compound that is a by-product of haemoglobin degradation. The haemoglobin that is released after the mononuclear phagocyte system (located in the liver and spleen) withdraws old red blood cells from circulation is degraded into its components; iron, protoporphyrin and protein. The system's cells convert the protoporphyrin into unconjugated bilirubin that passes through the circulatory system bound to protein, particularly albumin. The kidney is unable to filter out this bilirubin as it is bound to protein, however, it is conjugated with glucuronic acid in the liver to form water-soluble conjugated bilirubin. This conjugated bilirubin does not normally appear in the urine as it is excreted directly from the intestine in bile. Intestinal bacteria reduce the bilirubin to urobilinogen, which is later oxidised and either excreted with the faeces as stercobilin or in the urine as urobilin.

Conjugated bilirubin appears in urine when the normal degradation cycle is altered due to the obstruction of the biliary ducts or when the kidney's functional integrity is damaged. This allows the escape of conjugated bilirubin into the circulation as occurs in hepatitis and hepatic cirrhosis).

The detection of urinary bilirubin is an early indication of liver disease and its presence or absence can be used to determine the causes of clinical jaundice.

The jaundice produced by the accelerated destruction of red blood cells does not produce bilirubinuria, as the high serum bilirubin is found in the unconjugated form and the kidneys are unable to excrete it.

The test strips use a diazotization reaction in order to detect bilirubin. The bilirubin combines with a diazonium salt (2,4-dichloroaniline or 2,6-dichlorobenzene-diazonium-tetrafluoroborate) in an acid medium to produce an azo dye with colouration that varies from pink to violet:

- In acid medium
  Bilirubin glucuronide + Diazonium salt→ Azo dye (violet)

False positive reactions can be due to unusual pigments in the urine (for example, yellowy orange phenazopyridine metabolites, indican and the metabolites of the medicine Lodine (Etodolac)). False negatives can also be given by poorly stored samples as the bilirubin is photosensitive and undergoes photo oxidation to biliverdin when it is exposed to light, or hydrolysis of the glucuronide can occur producing free bilirubin which is less reactive.

==== Urobilinogen test ====
Intestinal bacteria convert the conjugated bilirubin that is excreted by the bile duct into the intestine into urobilinogen and stercobilinogen. Part of the urobilinogen is reabsorbed in the intestine then circulated in the blood to the liver where it is excreted. A small part of this recirculated urobilinogen is filtered out by the kidneys and appears in urine (less than 1 mg/dL urine). The stercobilinogen can not be reabsorbed and remains in the intestine.

Any deterioration in liver function reduces its ability to process the recirculated urobilinogen. The excess that remains in the blood is filtered out by the kidneys and appears in urine. When hemolytic disorders occur the amount of unconjugated bilirubin that is present in the blood increases causing an increase in hepatic excretion of conjugated bilirubin, resulting in increased amounts of urobilinogen that in turn causes an increase in reabsorption, recirculation and renal excretion.

The reactions that take place in the test strip vary according to the manufacturer, but in reality there are two reactions that are most frequently used. Some manufacturers use Ehrlich's reaction (1), in which urobilinogen reacts with p-dimethylaminobenzaldehyde (Ehrlich's reagent) in order to produce colours that vary from light to dark pink. Other manufacturers use a diazo coupling reaction (2) that uses 4-methoxybenzene-diazonium-tetrafluoroborate to produce colours that vary from white to pink. The latter reaction is more specific.

- (1) Reaction on Multistix (in acid medium)
  Urobilinogen + p-dimethylaminobenzaldehide → Red dye

- (2) Reaction on Chemstrip (in acid medium)
  Urobilinogen + 4-methoxibenzene-diazonium-tetrafluoroborate → Red azo dye

A number of substances interfere with the Ehrlich reaction on the Multistix strip: porphobilinogen, indican, p-amino salicylic acid, sulphonamide, methyldopa, procaine and chlorpromazine. The test should be carried out at room temperature as the reaction's sensitivity increases with temperature. Poorly stored samples can yield false negative results as the urobilinogen suffers photo oxidation to urobilin that does not react. The formaldehyde used as a preservative produces false negatives in both reactions.

=== Urinary infections ===
Urinary infections can be identified including bacteriuria and pyuria.

==== Nitrites test ====
The test for nitrites is a rapid screening method for possible asymptomatic infections caused by nitrate-reducing bacteria. Some of the gram negative bacteria species that most commonly cause urinary tract infections (Escherichia coli, Enterobacter, Klebsiella, Citrobacter and Proteus) have enzymes that reduce the nitrate present in urine to nitrite. The test is a rapid screen for possible infections by enteric bacteria, but it does not replace the urinalysis tests nor microscopic examination as diagnostic tools, nor subsequent monitoring as many other microorganisms that do not reduce nitrate (gram positive bacteria and yeasts) can also cause urinary infections.

The reactive strips detect nitrite by using the Griess reaction in which the nitrite reacts in an acid medium with an aromatic amine (para-arsanilic acid or sulphanilamide) in order to form a diazonium salt that in turn reacts with tetrahydrobenzoquinoline to produce a pink azo dye.

- 1) In an acid medium
  Para-arsanilic acid or sulphanilamide + NO^{−}_{2} → Diazonium salt

- 2) In an acid medium
  Diazonium salt + tetrahydrobenzoquinoline → Pink azo dye

The nitrite test is not particularly reliable and negative results in the presence of clinical symptoms are not uncommon, meaning that the test should not be taken as conclusive. Negative results can be obtained in the presence of non nitrate-reducing microorganisms. Nitrite-reducing bacteria need to remain in contact with nitrate for long enough to produce detectable amounts (first urine produced in the morning or at least with a urine retention of 4 hours). Large numbers of bacteria can react to reduce nitrite to nitrogen, which will give a false negative result. The use of antibiotics will inhibit bacterial metabolism causing negative results even though bacteria are present. In addition some substances such as ascorbic acid will compete with the Greiss reaction giving unrepresentatively low readings.

==== Leukocytes test ====
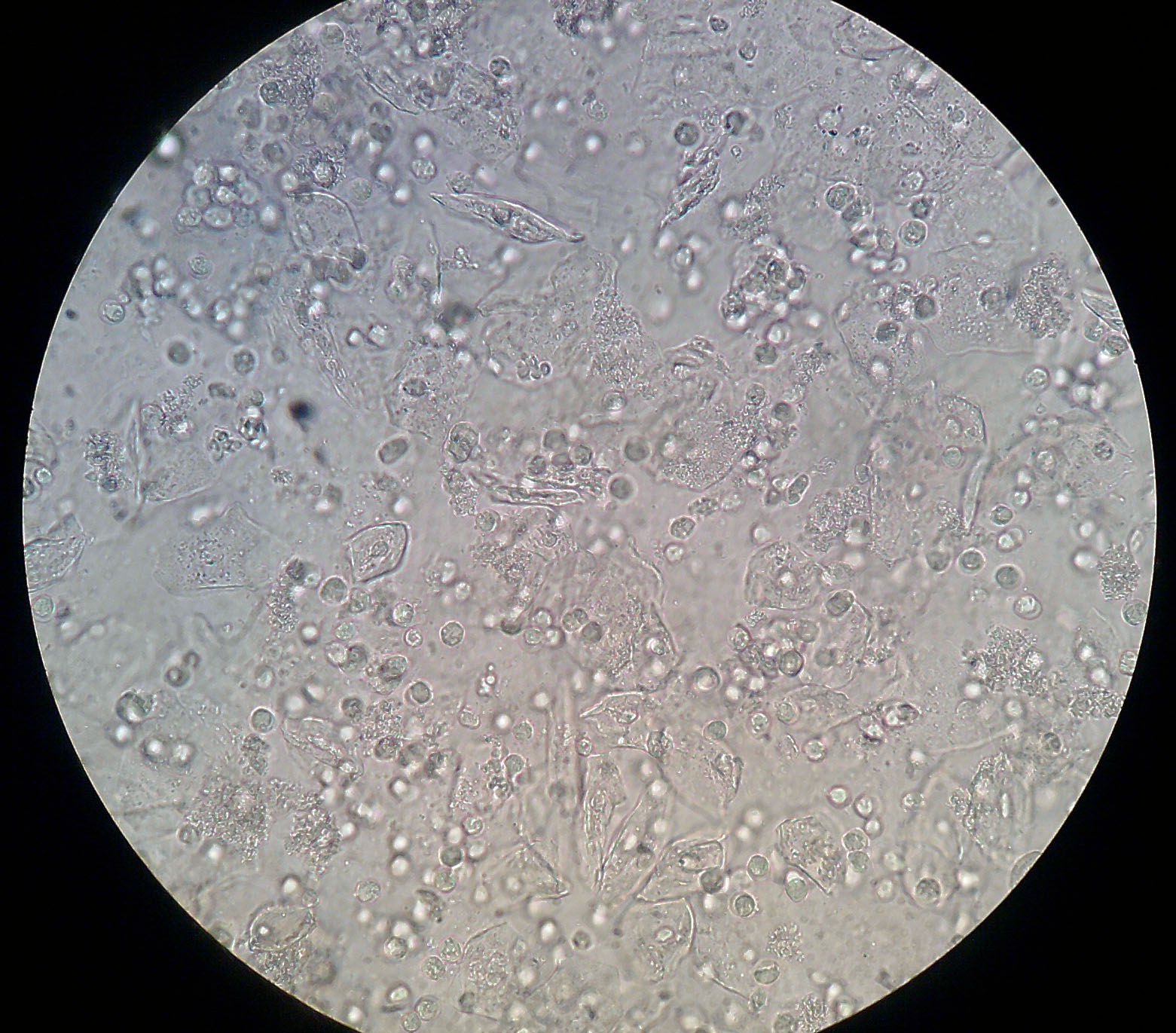
A sample of urine sediment from a patient suffering from a urinary infection, it is possible to see leukocytes (small round and granular), erythrocytes (small round and biconcave) and epithelial cells (large and polyhedral). The test for leukocyte esterase is indicative and does not replace microscopic examination of urine.

It is normal to find up to 3 (occasionally 5) leukocytes per high power field (40X) in a urine sample, with women having slightly higher results owing to vaginal contamination. Higher numbers indicate urinary infection. The urine test strip test for white blood cells detects leukocyte esterase, which is present in azurophilic granules of monocytes and granulocytes (neutrophilic, eosinophilic and basophilic). Bacteria, lymphocytes and epithelial cells from the genitourinary tract do not contain esterases. Neutrophil granulocytes are the leukocytes most commonly associated with urinary infections. A positive test for leukocyte esterase normally indicates the presence of bacteria and a positive nitrite test (although it is not always the case). Infections caused by Trichomonas, Chlamydia and yeasts produce leukocyturia without bacteriuria. The inflammation of the renal tissues (interstitial nephritis) can produce leukocyturia, in particular toxic interstitial nephritis with predominant eosinophils.

The test for leukocyte esterase is purely indicative and should not be solely relied on for diagnosis, as it does not replace microscopic or urine culture examinations.

The urine test strip reaction is based on the action of leukocyte esterase in catalysing the hydrolysis of an ester of indolecarboxylic acid. The indoxyl that is liberated combines with a diazonium salt in order to produce a violet coloured azole dye.

- 1) Reaction catalysed by leukocyte esterase
  Indolecarboxylic acid ester → Indoxyl + Acid

- 2) In acid medium
  Indoxyl + Diazonium salt → Violet azole dye

The esterase reaction needs about 2 minutes to take place. The presence of strong oxidising agents or formaldehyde can cause false positives. False negative results are associated with elevated concentrations of protein (greater than 500 mg/dL), glucose (greater than 3 g/dL), oxalic acid and ascorbic acid. Urine with a high specific gravity can also cause leukocyte crenation, which can impede the liberation of the esterases.

== Detection limit ==
The detection limit of a test is the concentration at which the test starts to turn from negative to positive. Although the detection limit may vary between urine samples, the detection limit is defined as the concentration of the analyte that results in a positive reaction in 90% of the examined urines.

Parameter	Reference range	Practical detection limit
Specific Gravity Reference range Physiological range	1.016–1.022 1.002–1.035	Range: 1.000–1.030
pH value First morning urine During the day	5–6 4.8–7.4	Range: 5–9
Leukocytes Reference range Grey zone	< 10 Leu/μL 10–20 Leu/μL	10–25 Leu/μL
Nitrite	–	0.05 mg/dL (11 μmol/L)
Protein Albumin	< 2 mg/dL	6 mg/dL
Glucose First morning urine During the day	< 20 mg/dL < 30 mg/dL	40 mg/dL (2.2 mmol/L)
Ketones Acetoacetic acid Acetone	< 5 mg/dL –	5 mg/dL (0.5 mmol/L) 40 mg/dL (7 mmol/L)
Urobilinogen	< 1 mg/dL	0.4 mg/dL (7 μmol/L)
Bilirubin	< 0.2 mg/dL	0.5 mg/dL (9 μmol/L)
Blood Erythrocytes Haemoglobin	0–5 Ery/μL –	5 Ery/μL 0.03 mg/dL Hb

== Medical uses ==
Urine test strips can be used in many areas of the healthcare chain including screening for routine examinations, treatment monitoring, self-monitoring by patients and/or general preventive medicine.

=== Screening ===
Urine test strips are used for screening both in hospitals and in general practice. The aim of screening is early identification of likely patients by examination of large groups of the population. The importance of screening for diabetes and kidney disease amongst high-risk populations is becoming very high.

=== Treatment monitoring ===
Treatment monitoring with the aid of urine test strips allows a health professional to check on the results of the prescribed therapy, and if necessary to introduce any changes into the course of therapy.

=== Self-monitoring ===
Self-monitoring with urine test strips under the guidance of a health professional is an effective method for monitoring the disease state. This applies particularly to diabetics, where the idea of self-monitoring of the metabolic status (determinations of glucose and ketones) is self-evident.

=== Veterinary ===
In veterinary medicine, especially in cats and dogs, the test strip can be used for urinalysis.

== History ==
In many cultures urine was once regarded as a mystical fluid, and in some cultures it is still regarded as such to this day. Its uses have included wound healing, stimulation of the body's defences, and examinations for diagnosing the presence of diseases.

It was only towards the end of the 18th century that doctors interested in chemistry turned their attention to the scientific basis of urinalysis and to its use in practical medicine.

- 1797 - Carl Friedrich Gärtner (1772–1850) expressed a wish for an easy way of testing urine for disease at the patient's bedside.
- 1797 - William Cumberland Cruikshank (1745–1800) described for the first time the property of coagulation on heating, exhibited by many urines.
- 1827 - English physician Richard Bright describes the clinical symptom of nephritis in “Reports of Medical Cases.”
- 1840 - The arrival of chemical urine diagnostics aimed at the detection of pathological urine constituents
- 1850 - Parisian chemist Jules Maumené (1818–1898) develops the first “test strips” when he impregnated a strip of merino wool with “tin protochloride” (stannous chloride). On application of a drop of urine and heating over a candle the strip immediately turned black if the urine contained sugar.
- 1883 - English physiologist George Oliver (1841–1915) markets his “Urinary Test Papers”
- approx. 1900 - Reagent papers become commercially obtainable from the chemical company of Helfenberg AG.
- 1904 - A test for the presence of blood by a wet-chemical method using benzidine became known.
- approx. 1920 - Viennese chemist Fritz Feigl (1891–1971) publishes his technique of “spot analysis".
- 1930s - Urine diagnostics makes major progress as reliability improves and test performance becomes progressively easier.
- 1950s - Urine test strips in the sense used today were first made on industrial scale and offered commercially.
- 1964 - The company Boehringer Mannheim, today Roche, launched its first Combur test strips.

Even though the test strips have changed little in appearance since the 1960s, they now contain a number of innovations. New impregnation techniques, more stable colour indicators, and the steady improvement in colour gradation have all contributed to the fact that the use of urine test strips has now become established in clinical and general practice as a reliable diagnostic instrument. The parameter menu offered has steadily grown longer in the intervening decades.

== Ascorbic acid interference ==
Ascorbic acid (vitamin C) is known to interfere with the oxidation reaction of the blood and glucose pad on common urine test strips. Some urine test strips are protected against the interference with iodate, which eliminates ascorbic acid by oxidation. Some test strips include a test for urinary ascorbate.

== Urinary sediment ==
During routine screening, if a positive test for leukocytes, blood, protein, nitrite, and a pH greater than 7 is identified, the urine sediment may be microscopically analysed to further pinpoint a diagnosis.

== Automated analysers ==
Automatic analysis of urine test strips using automated urine test strip analysers is a well-established practice in modern-day urinalysis. They can measure calcium, blood, glucose, bilirubin, urobilinogen, ketones, leukocytes, creatinine, microalbumin, pH, ascorbic acid and protein.
