= WHO model list of essential in vitro diagnostics =

World Health Organization (WHO) priority list of medical tests

The WHO model list of essential in vitro diagnostics, or WHO list of essential diagnostic tests (EDL) is a World Health Organization (WHO) priority list of medical tests that provides guidance for individual countries on which tests to use and which not to. It was first published in 2018, then revised in 2019, and a third edition was published in 2020.

Tests in community settings where there is no laboratory, are divided into general tests and tests that are disease-specific. Diseases that can be tested for in the community without laboratory facilities include: Chagas disease, cholera, COVID-19, diabetes mellitus, hepatitis B and C, HIV, influenza, malaria, Streptococcal pharyngitis, sickling disorders, syphilis, tuberculosis and visceral leishmaniasis. Where there is a health care facility with laboratories, tests are divided into either general tests or disease-specific tests for clinical laboratories, and disease-specific tests for blood screening laboratories. For each group of tests, the EDL specifies the test's name, purpose, assay format and type of specimen.

== Background ==
Without reliable tests, health care providers rely mainly on empirical treatments, which result in higher antibiotic use, use of multiple other medicines and underdiagnosis. The tests in the EDL are assessed using the REASSURED criteria; real time connectivity, ease of specimen collection, affordable, sensitive, specific, user-friendly, rapid and robust, results availability, equipment, and delivery. It allows treatments to be more precise.

The EDL is a priority list of medical tests, which the WHO defines as "one of the six building blocks of a health system". The EDL provides guidance for individual countries, on which medical tests to use and which not to. A Strategic Group of Experts on In Vitro Diagnostics (SAGE IVD) is appointed by the WHO to advise on its development as it is regularly reviewed and expanded. Different countries can adapt it; the Indian Council of Medical Research produced its own version of the EDL in 2019, a year after the first edition.

== Publications ==
The first edition was published by the WHO on 15 May 2018, and complements the WHO Model List of Essential Medicines (EML), which was published more than 40 years earlier. More than 150 countries have adapted the WHO Model List of Essential Medicines. A second edition was published in July 2019, and a third in 2020.

== Content ==
In the EDL, essential diagnostic tests are defined as those "that satisfy the priority health care needs of the population and are selected with due regard to disease prevalence and public health relevance, evidence of efficacy and accuracy, and comparative cost-effectiveness."

The first edition contained 62 test categories and the second was updated to include 122 test categories. The categories of tests include: general laboratory tests and disease-specific tests such as for hepatitis B and C, HIV, HPV, malaria, syphilis and tuberculosis. The third edition added a "Do Not Do" recommendation, for tests deemed no longer useful. Some tests such as a quick test for malaria, do not require a laboratory, a health care setting or professional, or electricity.

For each group of tests, the EDL specifies the test's name, purpose, assay format and type of specimen. Supporting WHO Guidelines or publications are linked and brands are not referenced. The EDL includes recommendations of types of tests that should be available in community settings where there are no laboratories, such as for anaemia, malaria or pregnancy. Laboratory tests such as those for testing for cancers are recommended for hospitals and laboratories.

=== Healthcare settings without laboratories ===
Tests in community settings without laboratories are divided into general tests and tests that are disease-specific. These include tests that are recommended for use in primary care units, doctors' offices, community clinics, ambulatory care and at home such as for self-testing.

General tests for use in community settings without laboratories
Specialty	Test	Test purpose	Assay	Specimen type
Blood typing	ABO blood groups and Rhesus (Rh) factor	Blood group	Slide agglutination test	Blood from capillary or vein
Clinical chemistry	Albumin	Detect/monitor kidney disease	Urine test strip	Urine
Clinical chemistry	Bilirubin	Detect/monitor liver disease and bile duct disorders	Urine test strip	Urine
Clinical chemistry	Glucose	Detect low glucose	Glucose meter	Urine
Clinical chemistry	Ketones	Detect/monitor ketosis (diabetes, starvation, pregnancy, diabetic ketoacidosis)	Dipstick	Urine
Clinical chemistry	Urinalysis test strips	Detect leukocytes or nitrites to help diagnose urinary tract infections	Dipstick	Urine
Haematology	Erythrocyte sedimentation rate (ESR)	To detect inflammation when C-reactive protein (CRP) unavailable	Westergren	Blood from vein
Haematology	Hemoglobin (Hb)	Diagnose/monitor anaemia and certain drugs (e.g. zidovudine), and to screen potential blood donors	Haemoglobinometer	Blood from capillary or vein
Haematology	Hemoglobin (Hb)	Marker for severe infections (e.g. malaria), Help diagnose intravascular haemolysis, kidney conditions, rhabdomyolysis (myoglobinuria)	Dipstick	Urine
Pregnancy testing	Human chorionic gonadotrophin (hCG)	Detect early pregnancy	Rapid diagnostic test (RDT) (dipstick and cassette), latex agglutination	Early morning urine

Tests in community settings without laboratories, which are disease-specific include tests for Chagas disease, cholera, COVID-19, diabetes mellitus, hepatitis B and C, HIV, influenza, malaria, Streptococcal pharyngitis, sickling disorders, syphilis, tuberculosis, visceral leishmaniasis.

=== Healthcare settings with laboratories ===
Where there is a health care facility with laboratories, tests are divided into either general tests or disease-specific tests for clinical laboratories, and disease-specific tests for blood screening laboratories.

=== Discontinued tests ===
The HIV western blot test and the Mycobacterium tuberculosis serology test are not recommended.
