= C33H36N4O6 =

The molecular formula C_{33}H_{36}N_{4}O_{6} (molar mass: 584.662 g/mol, exact mass: 584.2635 u) may refer to:

- Bilirubin
- Lumirubin
