= Claudio Tiribelli =

Italian hepatologist (born 1946)

Claudio Tiribelli MD, PhD
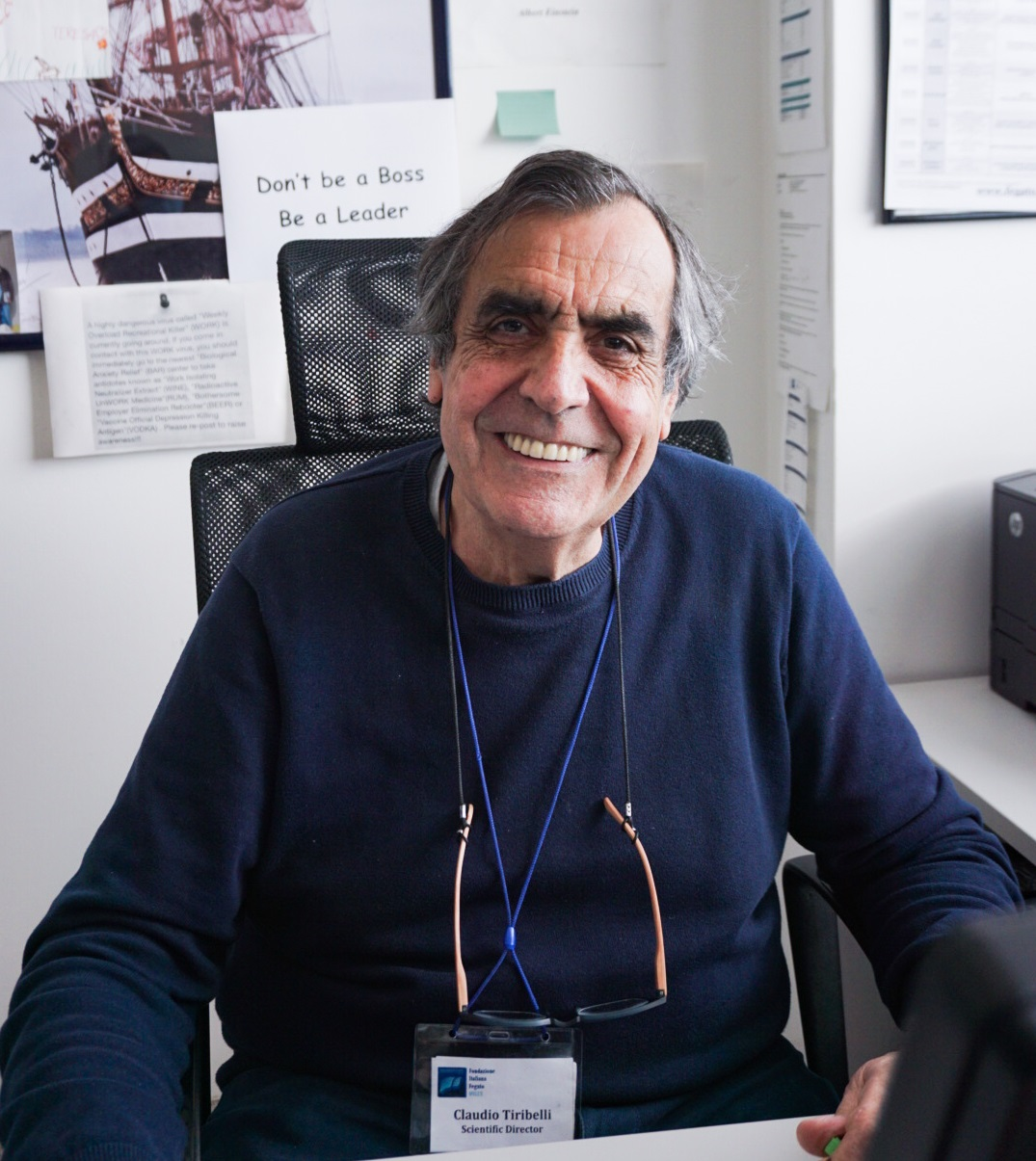
- Claudio Tiribelli
- Born: October 6, 1946 (age 80); Venice (Italy)
- Education: Università degli Studi di Padova (MD, 1971); University of Trieste (PhD, 1975)
- Occupations: Scientific Director, Italian Liver Foundation, NPO
- Organization(s): EASL, AASLD, APASL, IASL, Global Liver Foundation
- Honours: 2011, Honoris Causa Degree, Universidad Favaloro, Buenos Aires, Argentina and; 2012, Honoris Causa Degree, Universidad Nacional de Rosario, Rosario, Argentina; 2017 Leloir Prize, Ministerio_de_Ciencia,_Tecnología_e_Innovación_(Argentina)
- Medical career
- Profession: Clinical medical practice, teaching and research
- Field: Gastroenterology, hepatology, obesity
- Institutions: University of Trieste Units
- Sub-specialties: Bilirubin neurotoxicity
- Research: Bilirubin, neonatal jaundice, metabolic liver diseases, HCC, stem cells in HCC
- Website: https://www.fegato.it/eng/claudio-tiribelli/

Claudio Tiribelli (born 6 October 1946) is an Italian hepatologist best known for his studies on bilirubin and Kernicterus, a bilirubin-induced neurological condition.

== Biography ==
Born in Venice in 1946, Claudio Tiribelli graduated in Medicine and Surgery at the University of Padua and specialized in Gastroenterology at the University of Trieste.

After many experiences abroad, at the University of Groningen (Netherlands), the University of Toronto (Canada) and the Polytechnic University of Brooklyn (USA), Claudio Tiribelli returned to Italy at the University of Trieste, where since 1989 to 2008 he was Full Professor of Clinical Biochemistry and from 2009 to 2016 was Full Professor of Gastroenterology.

Previously Director of the Liver Pathologies Clinic and of the Department of Medicine at the Cattinara Hospital (Trieste), he was creator and Scientific Director of the Italian Liver Foundation - NPO, based at AREA Science Park in Basovizza. In Argentina he collaborated in the creation of the CAIC – Italian Argentinian Center for Cryobiology, the study of cryopreservation of cells and organs for medical purposes and for transplants.

For his merits and scientific contributions in international relations, in 2011 Prof. Tiribelli received the Honoris Causa Degree from the Universidad Favaloro in Argentina and in 2012 the Honoris Causa Degree, from the Universidad Nacional de Rosario in Argentina. In 2017 was awarded of the prestigious Leloir Prize, conferred to foreign experts who contributed to the enrichment of international cooperation with Argentina.

== Scientific activity ==
Since very early in his career, Tiribelli was fascinated by bilirubin. Expanding upon his research activity and expertise, he founded Bilimetrix together with Richard Wennberg. Bilimetrix developed the first point-of-care device for measuring bilirubin in newborns. Early detection of harmful bilirubin levels would prevent neonatal jaundice and allow the newborns to receive timely and proper treatment.

Due to his clinical activity and research interests, he is active in translational activity in several liver disorders as fatty liver disease and hepatocellular carcinoma. Together with his longstanding research associate Stefano Bellentani, he designed and performed the Dionysus Study, the first project exploring the prevalence and incidence of liver diseases in the general population.

Expert hepatologist, he is known above all for his studies on bilirubin and in particular on Kernicterus, a neurological damage induced by bilirubin. He is the creator and still Scientific Director of the Italian Liver Foundation - NPO, based at AREA Science Park in Basovizza, a research institution with focus on liver disease and its related pathologies.

He has more than 350 publications in peer-reviewed journals, as well as reviews, editorials, and book chapters. H-index 85 (49 since 2020)

== Scientific publications ==
Claudio has over 350 scientific publications, some of his most cited works are:

- "Bilirubin-Induced Neurologic Damage — Mechanisms and Management Approaches"
- "Prevalence of chronic liver diseases in the general population of Northern Italy: The Dionysos study"
- "Prevalence And Risk Factors For Hepatic Steatosis In Northern Italy"
- "The fatty liver index: a simple and accurate predictor of hepatic steatosis in the general population"
- "Molecular basis and mechanisms of progression of nonalcoholic steatohepatitis (NASH)"
- "Intestinal Integrity, the Microbiome and Inflammation"
