= Hy's law =

Medical rule of thumb regarding liver damage

Hy's law is a rule of thumb that a patient is at high risk of a fatal drug-induced liver injury if given a medication that causes hepatocellular injury (not Hepatobiliary injury) with jaundice. The law is based on observations by Hy Zimmerman, a major scholar of drug-induced liver injury. Some have suggested the principle be called a hypothesis or observation.

Hy's Law cases have three components:

- The drug causes hepatocellular injury, generally defined as an ALT or AST elevated 3-fold or more above the upper limit of normal, often with aminotransferases much greater (5-10×) than the upper limit of normal.
- Among subjects showing such aminotransferase elevations, they also have elevation of their serum total bilirubin of greater than 2× the upper limit of normal, without findings of cholestasis (defined as serum alkaline phosphatase activity less than 2× the upper limit of normal).
- No other reason can be found to explain the combination of increased aminotransferase and serum total bilirubin, such as viral hepatitis, alcohol abuse, ischemia, preexisting liver disease, or another drug capable of causing the observed injury.

In Zimmerman's analysis of 116 patients with hepatocellular injury and jaundice due to drug exposure, 76% went on to either require a liver transplant or died. Other studies have reported a lower but still significant mortality of 10%.
