= Heme =

Chemical coordination complex of an iron ion chelated to a porphyrin

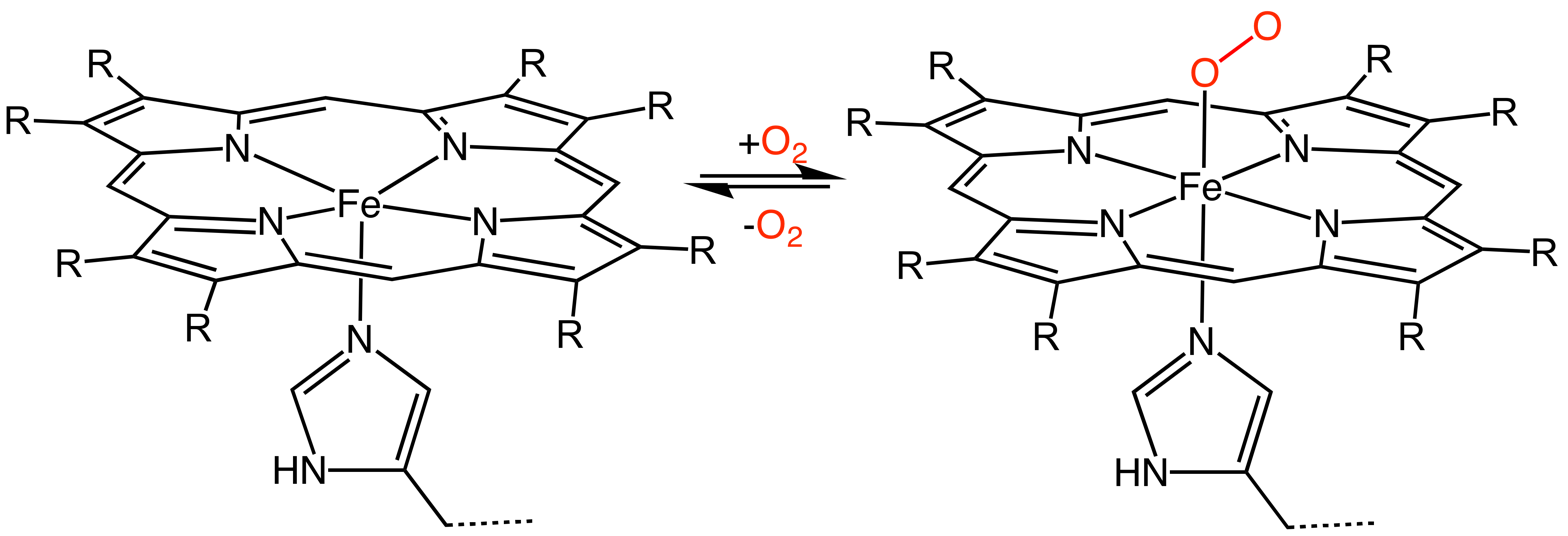
Binding of oxygen to a heme prosthetic group

Heme (American English), or haem (British English, both pronounced /hi:m/ HEEM), is a ring-shaped iron-containing molecule that serves as a ligand of various proteins, especially as a component of hemoglobin, which carries oxygen in the bloodstream. It is composed of four pyrrole rings with two vinyl and two propionic acid side chains. Heme is biosynthesized in both the bone marrow and the liver.

Heme plays a critical role in several redox reactions in mammals, due to its ability to carry the oxygen molecule. Reactions include oxidative metabolism (cytochrome c oxidase, succinate dehydrogenase), xenobiotic detoxification via cytochrome P450 pathways (including metabolism of some drugs), gas sensing (guanyl cyclases, nitric oxide synthase), and microRNA processing (DGCR8).

Heme is a coordination complex, consisting of an iron ion coordinated to a tetrapyrrole acting as a tetradentate ligand, and to one or two axial ligands. The definition is loose, and many depictions omit the axial ligands. Among the metalloporphyrins deployed by metalloproteins as prosthetic groups, heme is one of the most widely used and defines a family of proteins known as hemoproteins. Hemes are most commonly recognized as components of hemoglobin, the red pigment in blood, but are also found in a number of other biologically important hemoproteins such as myoglobin, cytochromes, catalases, heme peroxidase, and endothelial nitric oxide synthase.

The word haem is derived, from Ancient Greek, αἷμα, (Latinized: haima; Ancient Greek pronunciation: [/hâi̯.ma/]), meaning 'blood'.

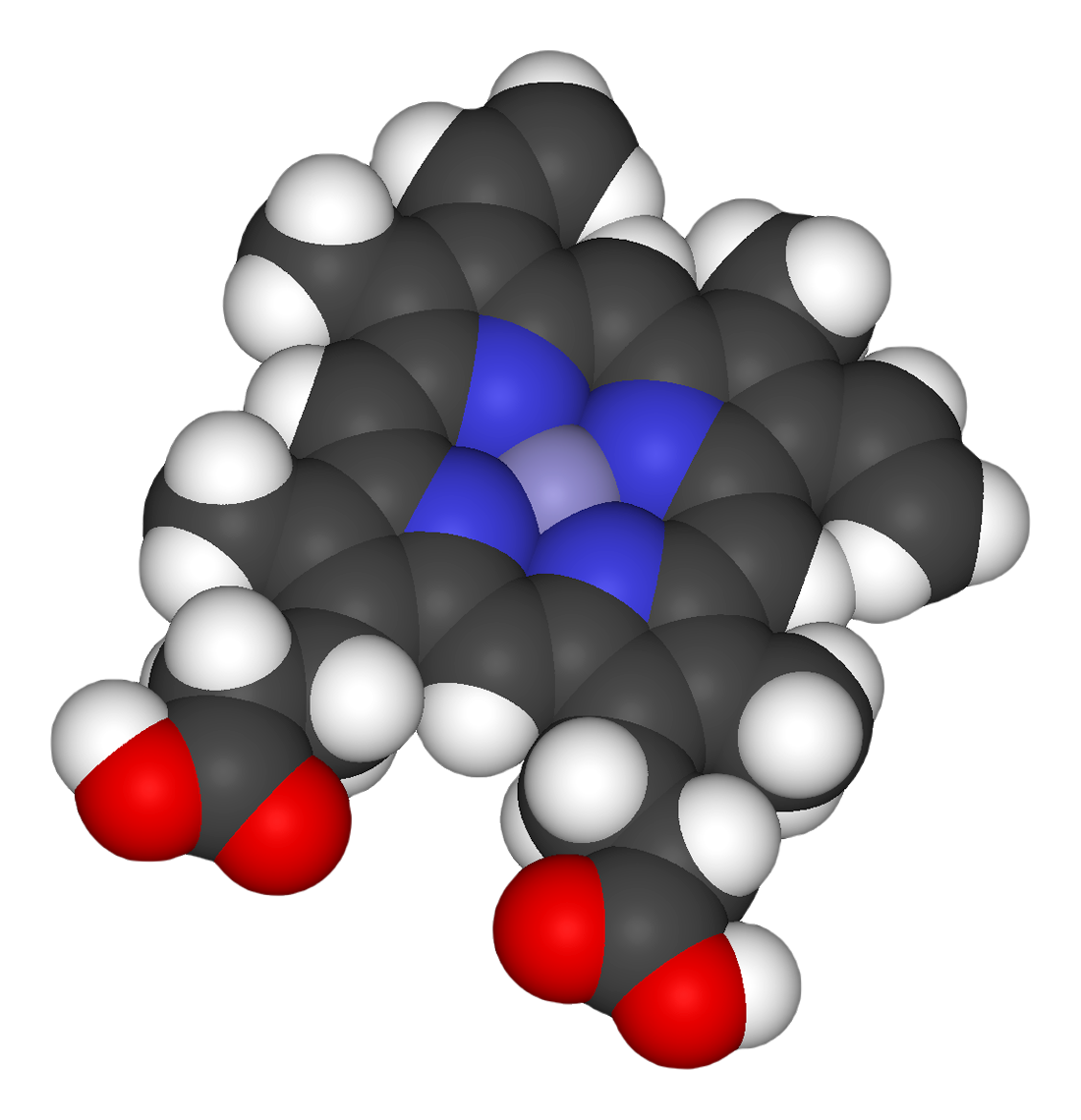
Space-filling model of the Fe-protoporphyrin IX subunit of heme B. Axial ligands omitted. Color scheme: grey=iron, blue=nitrogen, black=carbon, white=hydrogen, red=oxygen

== Function ==
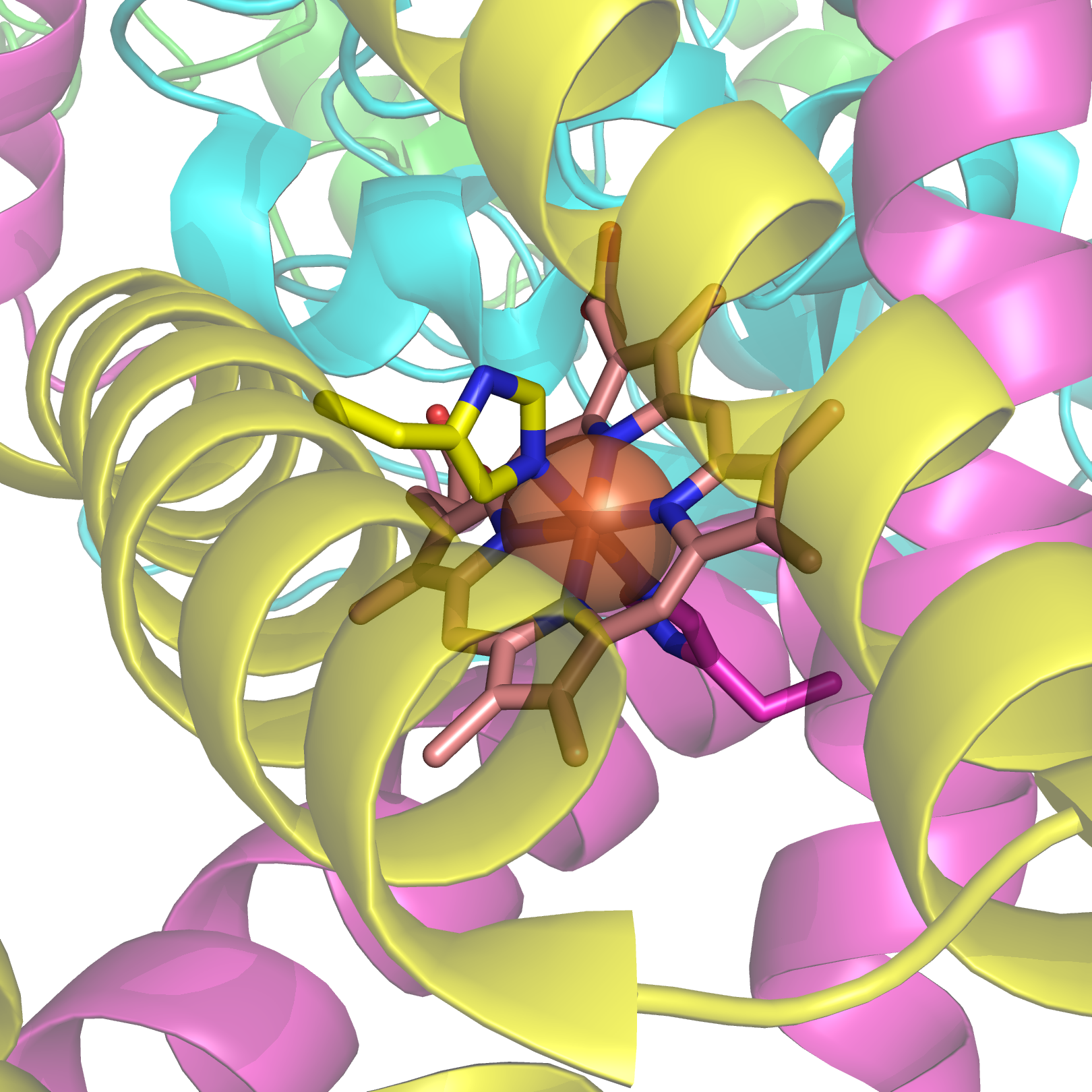
The heme group of succinate dehydrogenase bound to histidine, an electron carrier in the mitochondrial electron transfer chain. The large semi-transparent sphere indicates the location of the iron ion. From PDB: 1YQ3.

Hemoproteins have diverse biological functions including the transportation of diatomic gases, chemical catalysis, diatomic gas detection, and electron transfer. The heme iron serves as a source or sink of electrons during electron transfer or redox chemistry. In peroxidase reactions, the porphyrin molecule also serves as an electron source, being able to delocalize radical electrons in the conjugated ring. In the transportation or detection of diatomic gases, the gas binds to the heme iron. During the detection of diatomic gases, the binding of the gas ligand to the heme iron induces conformational changes in the surrounding protein. In general, diatomic gases only bind to the reduced heme, as ferrous Fe(II) while most peroxidases cycle between Fe(III) and Fe(IV) and hemeproteins involved in mitochondrial redox, oxidation-reduction, cycle between Fe(II) and Fe(III).

It has been speculated that the original evolutionary function of hemoproteins was electron transfer in primitive sulfur-based photosynthesis pathways in ancestral cyanobacteria-like organisms before the appearance of molecular oxygen.

Hemoproteins achieve their remarkable functional diversity by modifying the environment of the heme macrocycle within the protein matrix. For example, the ability of hemoglobin to effectively deliver oxygen to tissues is due to specific amino acid residues located near the heme molecule. Hemoglobin reversibly binds to oxygen in the lungs when the pH is high, and the carbon dioxide concentration is low. When the situation is reversed (low pH and high carbon dioxide concentrations), hemoglobin will release oxygen into the tissues. This phenomenon, which states that hemoglobin's oxygen binding affinity is inversely proportional to both acidity and concentration of carbon dioxide, is known as the Bohr effect. The molecular mechanism behind this effect is the steric organization of the globin chain; a histidine residue, located adjacent to the heme group, becomes positively charged under acidic conditions (which are caused by dissolved CO_{2} in working muscles, etc.), releasing oxygen from the heme group.

== Types ==
=== Major hemes ===
There are several biologically important kinds of heme:

	Heme A	Heme B	Heme C	Heme O
PubChem number	7888115	444098	444125	6323367
Chemical formula	C_{49}H_{56}O_{6}N_{4}Fe	C_{34}H_{32}O_{4}N_{4}Fe	C_{34}H_{36}O_{4}N_{4}S_{2}Fe	C_{49}H_{58}O_{5}N_{4}Fe
Functional group at C_{3}	–CH(OH)CH_{2}Far	–CH=CH_{2}	–CH(cystein-S-yl)CH_{3}	–CH(OH)CH_{2}Far
Functional group at C_{8}	–CH=CH_{2}	–CH=CH_{2}	–CH(cystein-S-yl)CH_{3}	–CH=CH_{2}
Functional group at C_{18}	–CH=O	–CH_{3}	–CH_{3}	–CH_{3}

Structure of Fe-porphyrin subunit of heme B.

Structure of Fe-porphyrin subunit of heme A. Heme A is synthesized from heme B. In two sequential reactions, a 17-hydroxyethylfarnesyl moiety is added at the 2-position and an aldehyde is added at the 8-position.

The most common type is heme B; other important types include heme A and heme C. Isolated hemes are commonly designated by capital letters, while hemes bound to proteins are designated by lower case letters. Cytochrome a refers to the heme A in specific combination with membrane protein forming a portion of cytochrome c oxidase.

=== Other hemes ===
The following carbon numbering system of porphyrins is an older numbering used by biochemists and not the 1–24 numbering system recommended by IUPAC, which is shown in the table above.

- Heme l is the derivative of heme B, which is covalently attached to the protein of lactoperoxidase, eosinophil peroxidase, and thyroid peroxidase. The addition of peroxide with the glutamyl-375 and aspartyl-225 of lactoperoxidase forms ester bonds between these amino acid residues and the heme 1- and 5-methyl groups, respectively. Similar ester bonds with these two methyl groups are thought to form in eosinophil and thyroid peroxidases. Heme l is one important characteristic of animal peroxidases; plant peroxidases incorporate heme B. Lactoperoxidase and eosinophil peroxidase are protective enzymes responsible for the destruction of invading bacteria and virus. Thyroid peroxidase is the enzyme catalyzing the biosynthesis of the important thyroid hormones. Because lactoperoxidase destroys invading organisms in the lungs and excrement, it is thought to be an important protective enzyme.
- Heme m is the derivative of heme B covalently bound at the active site of myeloperoxidase. Heme m contains the two ester bonds at the heme 1- and 5-methyl groups also present in heme l of other mammalian peroxidases, such as lactoperoxidase and eosinophil peroxidase. In addition, a unique sulfonamide ion linkage between the sulfur of a methionyl amino-acid residue and the heme 2-vinyl group is formed, giving this enzyme the unique capability of easily oxidizing chloride and bromide ions to hypochlorite and hypobromite. Myeloperoxidase is present in mammalian neutrophils and is responsible for the destruction of invading bacteria and viral agents. It perhaps synthesizes hypobromite by "mistake". Both hypochlorite and hypobromite are very reactive species responsible for the production of halogenated nucleosides, which are mutagenic compounds.
- Heme D is another derivative of heme B, but one in which the propionic acid side chain at position 6, which is also hydroxylated, forms a γ-spirolactone. Ring III is also hydroxylated at position 5, in a conformation trans to the new lactone group. Heme D is the site for oxygen reduction to water for many types of bacteria at low oxygen tension.
- Heme S is related to heme B by having a formyl group at position 2 in place of the 2-vinyl group. Heme S is found in the hemoglobin of a few species of marine worms. The correct structures of heme B and heme S were first elucidated by the German chemist Hans Fischer.

The names of cytochromes typically (but not always) reflect the kinds of hemes they contain: cytochrome a contains heme A, cytochrome c contains heme C, etc. This convention may have been first introduced with the publication of the structure of heme A.

=== Use of capital letters to designate the type of heme ===
The practice of designating hemes with upper case letters was formalized in a footnote in a paper by Puustinen and Wikstrom, which explains under which conditions a capital letter should be used: "we prefer the use of capital letters to describe the heme structure as isolated. Lowercase letters may then be freely used for cytochromes and enzymes, as well as to describe individual protein-bound heme groups (for example, cytochrome bc, and aa3 complexes, cytochrome b_{5}, heme c_{1} of the bc_{1} complex, heme a_{3} of the aa_{3} complex, etc)." In other words, the chemical compound would be designated with a capital letter, but specific instances in structures with lowercase. Thus cytochrome oxidase, which has two A hemes (heme a and heme a_{3}) in its structure, contains two moles of heme A per mole protein. Cytochrome bc_{1}, with hemes b_{H}, b_{L}, and c_{1}, contains heme B and heme C in a 2:1 ratio. The practice seems to have originated in a paper by Caughey and York in which the product of a new isolation procedure for the heme of cytochrome aa3 was designated heme A to differentiate it from previous preparations: "Our product is not identical in all respects with the heme a obtained in solution by other workers by the reduction of the hemin a as isolated previously (2). For this reason, we shall designate our product heme A until the apparent differences can be rationalized." In a later paper, Caughey's group uses capital letters for isolated heme B and C as well as A.

== Synthesis ==
Heme synthesis in the cytoplasm and mitochondrion

The enzymatic process that produces heme is properly called porphyrin synthesis, as all the intermediates are tetrapyrroles that are chemically classified as porphyrins. The process is highly conserved across biology. In humans, this pathway serves almost exclusively to form heme. In bacteria, it also produces more complex substances, such as cofactor F430 and cobalamin (vitamin B_{12}).

The pathway is initiated by the synthesis of δ-aminolevulinic acid (dALA or δALA) from the amino acid glycine and succinyl-CoA from the citric acid cycle (Krebs cycle). The rate-limiting enzyme responsible for this reaction, ALA synthase, is negatively regulated by glucose and heme concentration. Mechanism of inhibition of ALAs by heme or hemin is by decreasing stability of mRNA synthesis and by decreasing the intake of mRNA in the mitochondria. This mechanism is of therapeutic importance: infusion of heme arginate or hematin and glucose can abort attacks of acute intermittent porphyria in patients with an inborn error of metabolism of this process, by reducing transcription of ALA synthase.

The organs mainly involved in heme synthesis are the liver (in which the rate of synthesis is highly variable, depending on the systemic heme pool) and the bone marrow (in which rate of synthesis of Heme is relatively constant and depends on the production of globin chain), although every cell requires heme to function properly. However, due to its toxic properties, proteins such as Hemopexin (Hx) are required to help maintain physiological stores of iron in order for them to be used in synthesis. Heme is seen as an intermediate molecule in catabolism of hemoglobin in the process of bilirubin metabolism. Defects in various enzymes in synthesis of heme can lead to group of disorder called porphyrias, which include acute intermittent porphyria, congenital erythropoetic porphyria, porphyria cutanea tarda, hereditary coproporphyria, variegate porphyria, and erythropoietic protoporphyria.

== Synthesis for food ==
Impossible Foods, producers of plant-based meat substitutes, use an accelerated heme synthesis process involving soybean root leghemoglobin and yeast, adding the resulting heme to items such as meatless (vegan) Impossible burger patties. The DNA for leghemoglobin production was extracted from the soybean root nodules and expressed in yeast cells to overproduce heme for use in the meatless burgers. This process claims to create a meaty flavor in the resulting products.

== Degradation ==
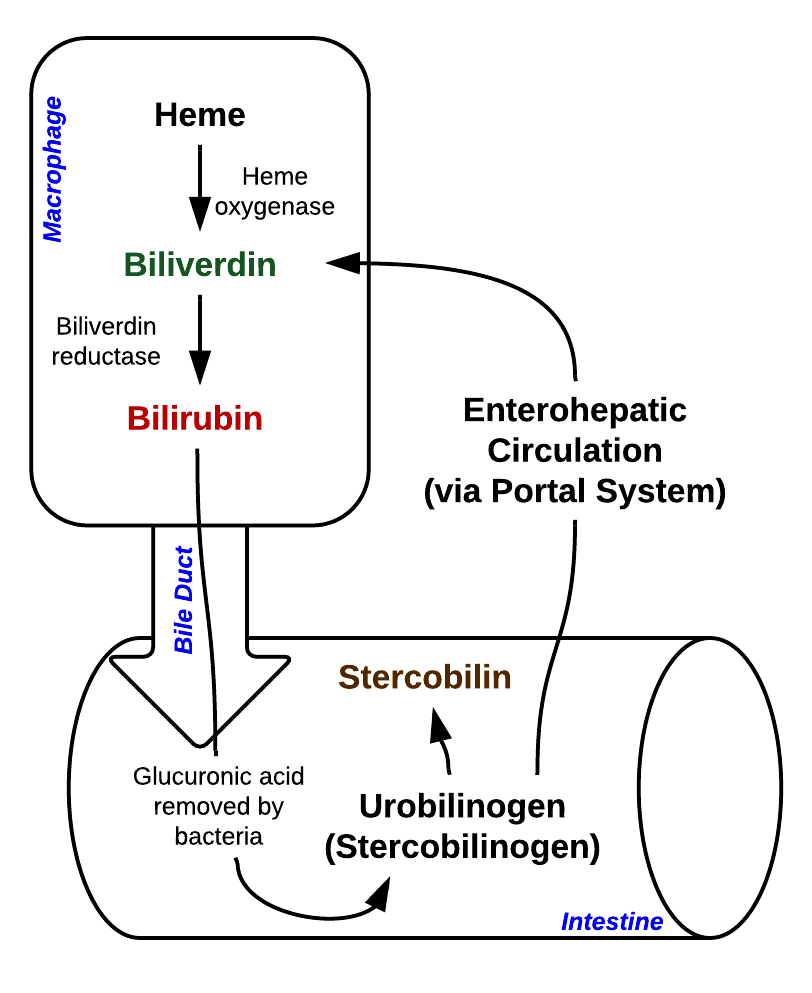
Heme breakdown

Degradation begins inside macrophages of the spleen, which remove old and damaged erythrocytes from the circulation.

In the first step, heme is converted to biliverdin by the enzyme heme oxygenase. NADPH is used as the reducing agent, molecular oxygen enters the reaction, carbon monoxide (CO) is produced and the iron is released from the molecule as the ferrous ion (Fe^{2+}). CO acts as a cellular messenger and functions in vasodilation.

In addition, heme degradation appears to be an evolutionarily-conserved response to oxidative stress. Briefly, when cells are exposed to free radicals, there is a rapid induction of the expression of the stress-responsive heme oxygenase-1 (HMOX1) isoenzyme that catabolizes heme (see below). The reason why cells must increase exponentially their capability to degrade heme in response to oxidative stress remains unclear but this appears to be part of a cytoprotective response that avoids the deleterious effects of free heme. When large amounts of free heme accumulates, the heme detoxification/degradation systems get overwhelmed, enabling heme to exert its damaging effects.

heme	heme oxygenase-1		biliverdin + Fe^{2+}
	H^{+} + NADPH + O_{2}	NADP^{+} + CO

In the second reaction, biliverdin is converted to bilirubin by biliverdin reductase (BVR):

biliverdin	biliverdin reductase		bilirubin
	H^{+} + NADPH	NADP^{+}

Bilirubin is transported into the liver by facilitated diffusion bound to a protein (serum albumin), where it is conjugated with glucuronic acid to become more water-soluble. The reaction is catalyzed by the enzyme UDP-glucuronosyltransferase.

bilirubin	UDP-glucuronosyltransferase		bilirubin diglucuronide
	2 UDP-glucuronide	2 UMP + 2 P_{i}

This form of bilirubin is excreted from the liver in bile. Excretion of bilirubin from liver to biliary canaliculi is an active, energy-dependent and rate-limiting process. The intestinal bacteria deconjugate bilirubin diglucuronide releasing free bilirubin, which can either be reabsorbed or reduced to urobilinogen by the bacterial enzyme bilirubin reductase.

bilirubin	bilirubin reductase		urobilinogen
	4 NAD(P)H + 4 H^{+}	4 NAD(P)^{+}

Some urobilinogen is absorbed by intestinal cells and transported into the kidneys and excreted with urine (urobilin, which is the product of oxidation of urobilinogen, and is responsible for the yellow colour of urine). The remainder travels down the digestive tract and is converted to stercobilinogen. This is oxidized to stercobilin, which is excreted and is responsible for the brown color of feces.

== In health and disease ==
Under homeostasis, the reactivity of heme is controlled by its insertion into the "heme pockets" of hemoproteins. Under oxidative stress however, some hemoproteins, e.g. hemoglobin, can release their heme prosthetic groups. The non-protein-bound (free) heme produced in this manner becomes highly cytotoxic, most probably due to the iron atom contained within its protoporphyrin IX ring, which can act as a Fenton's reagent to catalyze in an unfettered manner the production of free radicals. It catalyzes the oxidation and aggregation of protein, the formation of cytotoxic lipid peroxide via lipid peroxidation and damages DNA through oxidative stress. Due to its lipophilic properties, it impairs lipid bilayers in organelles such as mitochondria and nuclei. These properties of free heme can sensitize a variety of cell types to undergo programmed cell death in response to pro-inflammatory agonists, a deleterious effect that plays an important role in the pathogenesis of certain inflammatory diseases such as malaria and sepsis.

=== Cancer ===
There is an association between high intake of heme iron sourced from meat and increased risk of colorectal cancer via nitrosamine formation during digestion (N-nitroso).

The American Institute for Cancer Research (AICR) and World Cancer Research Fund International (WCRF) concluded in a 2018 report that there is limited but suggestive evidence that foods containing heme iron increase risk of colorectal cancer. A 2019 review found that heme iron intake is associated with increased breast cancer risk.

== Genes ==
The following genes are part of the chemical pathway for making heme:

- ALAD: aminolevulinic acid, δ-, dehydratase (deficiency causes ala-dehydratase deficiency porphyria)
- ALAS1: aminolevulinate, δ-, synthase 1
- ALAS2: aminolevulinate, δ-, synthase 2 (deficiency causes sideroblastic/hypochromic anemia)
- CPOX: coproporphyrinogen oxidase (deficiency causes hereditary coproporphyria)
- FECH: ferrochelatase (deficiency causes erythropoietic protoporphyria)
- HMBS: hydroxymethylbilane synthase (deficiency causes acute intermittent porphyria)
- PPOX: protoporphyrinogen oxidase (deficiency causes variegate porphyria)
- UROD: uroporphyrinogen decarboxylase (deficiency causes porphyria cutanea tarda)
- UROS: uroporphyrinogen III synthase (deficiency causes congenital erythropoietic porphyria)
