= Lumirubin =

- (Z)-isomer of lumirubin

Names
- IUPAC name 3-[2-[[6-(2-carboxyethyl)-7,11-dimethyl-12-oxo-4,13-diazatricyclo[8.3.0.0^{3,7}]trideca-1,3,5,9-tetraen-5-yl]methyl]-5-[(E)-(4-ethenyl-3-methyl-5-oxopyrrol-2-ylidene)methyl]-4-methyl-1H-pyrrol-3-yl]propanoic acid

Identifiers
CAS Number	110617-57-7; 83664-21-5
3D model (JSmol)	Interactive image
ChemSpider	4946083
PubChem CID	135754285
- InChI: InChI=1S/C33H36N4O6/c1-6-19-16(2)24(36-32(19)43)13-23-17(3)20(7-9-29(38)39)25(34-23)14-27-22(8-10-30(40)41)33(5)12-11-21-18(4)31(42)37-26(21)15-28(33)35-27/h6,11,13,15,18,34H,1,7-10,12,14H2,2-5H3,(H,36,43)(H,37,42)(H,38,39)(H,40,41)/b24-13+ Key: BYVDUQYJIIPFIB-ZMOGYAJESA-N
- SMILES: CC1C2=CCC3(C(=NC(=C3CCC(=O)O)CC4=C(C(=C(N4)/C=C/5\C(=C(C(=O)N5)C=C)C)C)CCC(=O)O)C=C2NC1=O)C

Properties
Chemical formula	C_{33}H_{36}N_{4}O_{6}
Molar mass	584.673 g·mol^{−1}
- Except where otherwise noted, data are given for materials in their standard state (at 25 °C [77 °F], 100 kPa). Infobox references

Lumirubin is a structural isomer of bilirubin, which is formed during phototherapy used to treat neonatal jaundice. This polar isomer resulting from the blue-green lights of phototherapy has an active site to albumin, and its effects are considered less toxic than those of bilirubin. Lumirubin is excreted into bile or urine. ZZ, ZE, EE and EZ are the four structural isomers of bilirubin. ZZ is the stable, more insoluble form. Other forms are relatively soluble and are known as lumirubins. Phototherapy converts the ZZ form into lumirubins. Monoglucuronylated lumirubins are easily excreted.
