= Stercobilinogen =

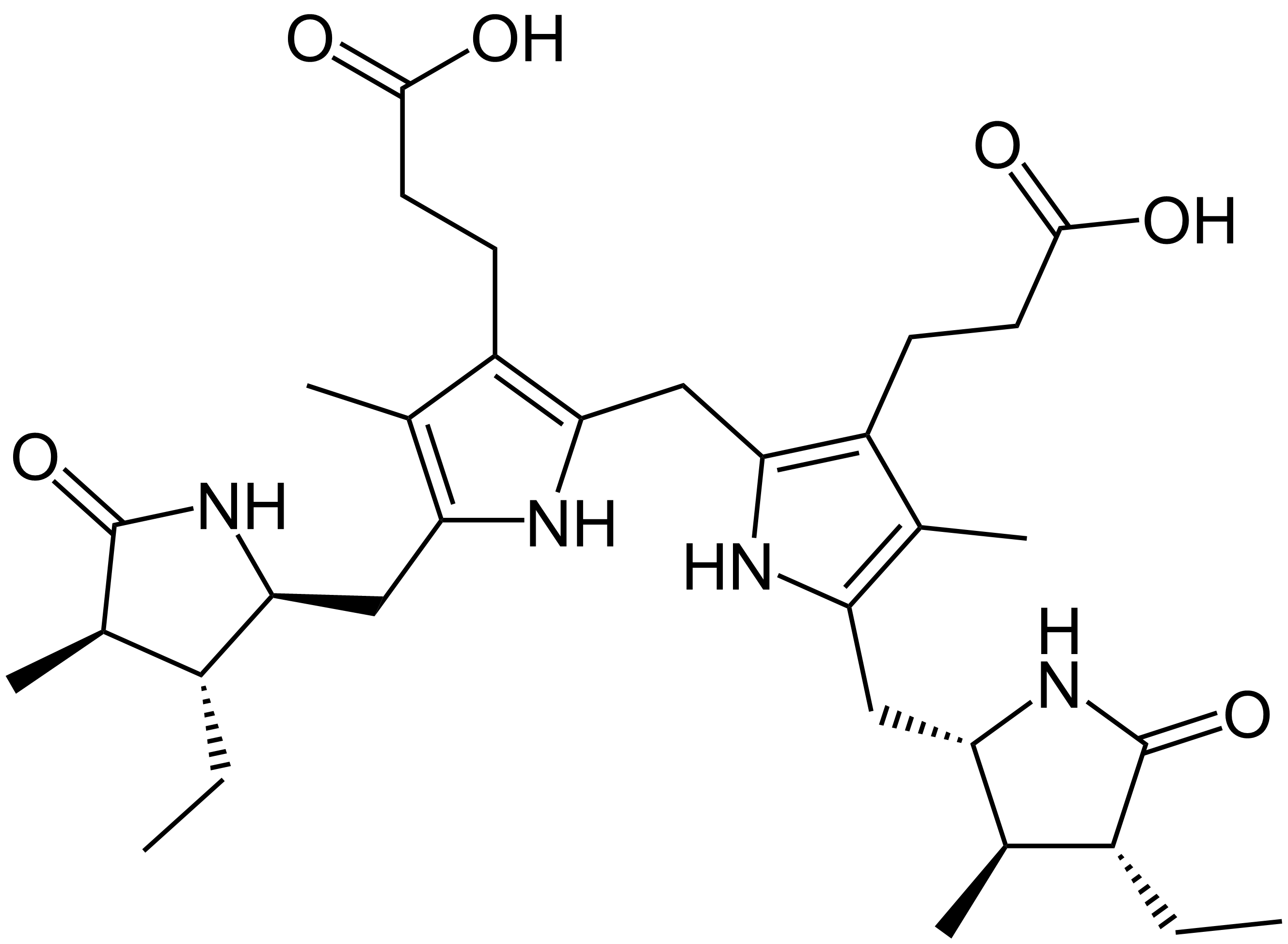

Names
- IUPAC name 3-[2-[[3-(2-carboxyethyl)-5-[[(2S,3R,4R)-4-ethyl-3-methyl-5-oxopyrrolidin-2-yl]methyl]-4-methyl-1H-pyrrol-2-yl]methyl]-5-[[(2S,3R,4R)-3-ethyl-4-methyl-5-oxopyrrolidin-2-yl]methyl]-4-methyl-1H-pyrrol-3-yl]propanoic acid
- Other names Fecal urobilinogen

Identifiers
CAS Number	17095-63-5
3D model (JSmol)	Interactive image
ChEBI	CHEBI:6320
ChemSpider	7827641
MeSH	Stercobilinogen
PubChem CID	9548718
UNII	91VQJ22OZ5
CompTox Dashboard (EPA)	DTXSID80904012
- InChI: InChI=1S/C33H48N4O6/c1-7-20-19(6)32(42)37-27(20)14-25-18(5)23(10-12-31(40)41)29(35-25)15-28-22(9-11-30(38)39)17(4)24(34-28)13-26-16(3)21(8-2)33(43)36-26/h16,19-21,26-27,34-35H,7-15H2,1-6H3,(H,36,43)(H,37,42)(H,38,39)(H,40,41)/t16-,19-,20-,21-,26+,27+/m1/s1 Key: VKGRRZVYCXLHII-OLFWPHQKSA-N; InChI=1/C33H48N4O6/c1-7-20-19(6)32(42)37-27(20)14-25-18(5)23(10-12-31(40)41)29(35-25)15-28-22(9-11-30(38)39)17(4)24(34-28)13-26-16(3)21(8-2)33(43)36-26/h16,19-21,26-27,34-35H,7-15H2,1-6H3,(H,36,43)(H,37,42)(H,38,39)(H,40,41)/t16-,19-,20-,21-,26+,27+/m1/s1 Key: VKGRRZVYCXLHII-OLFWPHQKBU
- SMILES: CC[C@@H]1[C@H](C(=O)N[C@H]1CC2=C(C(=C(N2)CC3=C(C(=C(N3)C[C@H]4[C@@H]([C@H](C(=O)N4)CC)C)C)CCC(=O)O)CCC(=O)O)C)C

Properties
Chemical formula	C_{33}H_{48}N_{4}O_{6}
Molar mass	596.769 g·mol^{−1}
- Except where otherwise noted, data are given for materials in their standard state (at 25 °C [77 °F], 100 kPa). verify (what is ?) Infobox references

Stercobilinogen (fecal urobilinogen) is a chemical created by bacteria in the gut. It is made of broken-down hemoglobin. It is further processed to become the chemical that gives feces its brown color.

Bilirubin is a pigment that results from the breakdown of the heme portion of hemoglobin. The liver conjugates bilirubin, making it water-soluble; and the conjugated form is then excreted in urine as urobilinogen and in the feces as stercobilinogen. Urobilinogen / stercobilinogen is colourless and is further oxidised to stercobilin which imparts colour to feces. Darkening of feces upon standing in air is due to the oxidation of residual urobilinogens to urobilins. In the intestine, bilirubin is converted by bacteria to stercobilinogen. Stercobilinogen is absorbed and excreted by either the liver or the kidney.
