= Stercobilin =

Brown pigment of bile origin

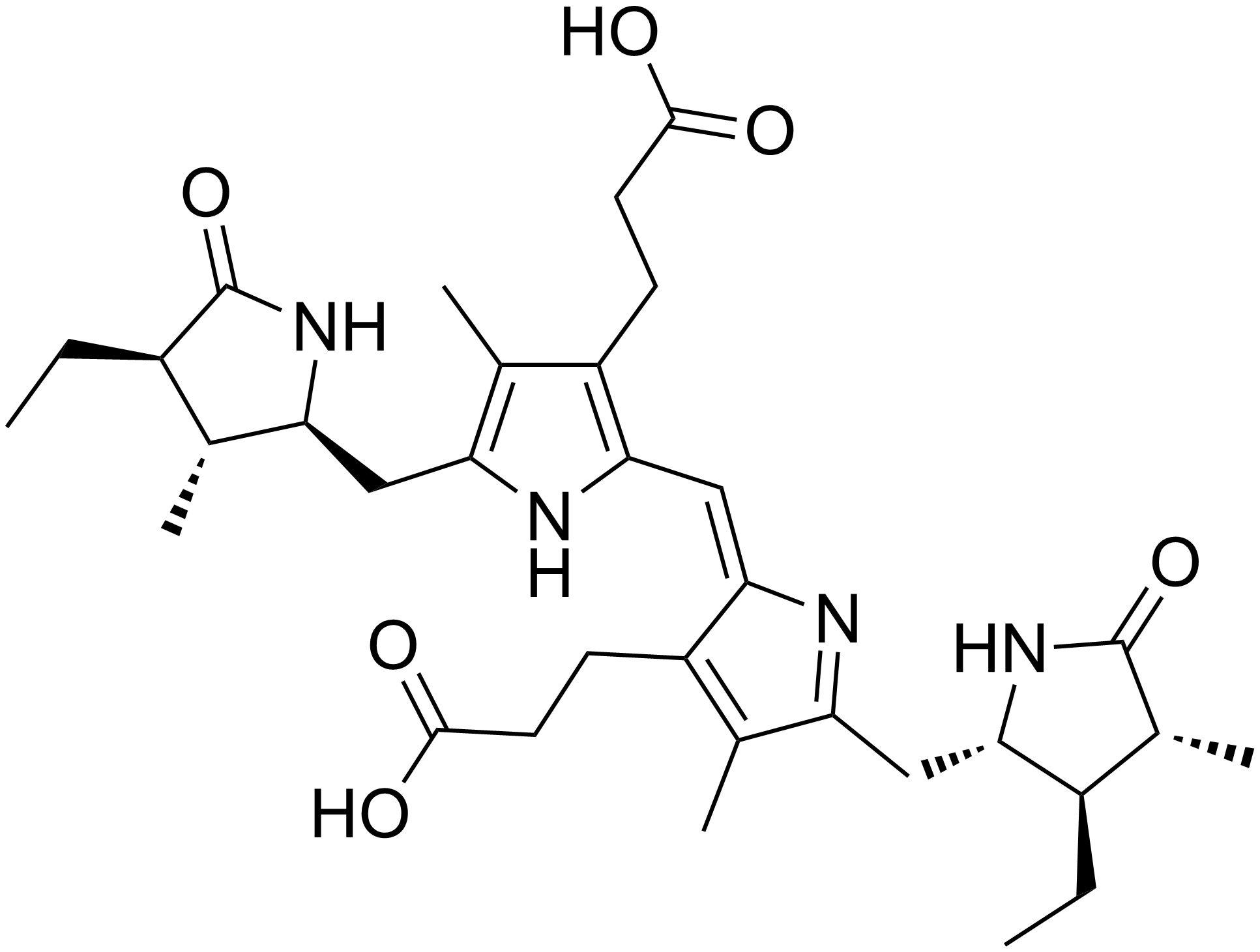

Names
- IUPAC name 3-[(2E)-2-[[3-(2-Carboxyethyl)-5-[(4-ethyl-3-methyl-5-oxo-pyrrolidin-2-yl)methyl]-4-methyl-1H-pyrrol-2-yl]methylidene]-5-[(3-ethyl-4-methyl-5-oxo-pyrrolidin-2-yl) methyl]-4-methyl-pyrrol-3-yl]propanoic acid

Identifiers
CAS Number	34217-90-8
3D model (JSmol)	Interactive image
Beilstein Reference	5326728
ChEBI	CHEBI:29023
ChemSpider	16736732
ECHA InfoCard	100.047.155
EC Number	251-887-8
KEGG	C05793
MeSH	Stercobilin
PubChem CID	5280818
UNII	17G380DO11
CompTox Dashboard (EPA)	DTXSID00885576
- InChI: InChI=1S/C33H46N4O6/c1-7-20-19(6)32(42)37-27(20)14-25-18(5)23(10-12-31(40)41)29(35-25)15-28-22(9-11-30(38)39)17(4)24(34-28)13-26-16(3)21(8-2)33(43)36-26/h15-16,19-21,26-27,35H,7-14H2,1-6H3,(H,36,43)(H,37,42)(H,38,39)(H,40,41)/b28-15-/t16-,19-,20-,21-,26+,27+/m1/s1 Key: DEEUSUJLZQQESV-BQUSTMGCSA-N
- SMILES: CC[C@@H]1[C@H](C(=O)N[C@H]1Cc2c(c(c([nH]2)/C=C\3/C(=C(C(=N3)C[C@H]4[C@@H]([C@H](C(=O)N4)CC)C)C)CCC(=O)O)CCC(=O)O)C)C

Properties
Chemical formula	C_{33}H_{46}N_{4}O_{6}
Molar mass	594.742
- Except where otherwise noted, data are given for materials in their standard state (at 25 °C [77 °F], 100 kPa). verify (what is ?) Infobox references

Stercobilin is a tetrapyrrolic bile pigment and is one end-product of heme catabolism. It is the chemical responsible for the brown color of human feces and was originally isolated from feces in 1932. Stercobilin (and related urobilin) can be used as a marker for biochemical identification of fecal pollution levels in rivers.

== Metabolism ==
Stercobilin results from breakdown of the heme moiety of hemoglobin found in erythrocytes (red blood cells). Macrophages break down senescent erythrocytes and break the heme down into biliverdin, which rapidly reduces to free bilirubin. Bilirubin binds tightly to plasma proteins (especially albumin) in the blood stream and is transported to the liver, where it is conjugated with one or two glucuronic acid residues into bilirubin diglucuronide, and secreted into the small intestine as bile. In the small intestine, some bilirubin glucuronide is converted back to bilirubin via bacterial enzymes in the terminal ileum. This bilirubin is further converted to colorless urobilinogen by the bacterial enzyme bilirubin reductase. Urobilinogen that remains in the colon can either be reduced to stercobilinogen and finally oxidized to stercobilin, or it can be directly reduced to stercobilin. Stercobilin is responsible for the brown color of human feces. Stercobilin is then excreted in the feces.

== Role in disease ==
=== Obstructive jaundice ===
In obstructive jaundice, no bilirubin reaches the small intestine, meaning that there is no formation of stercobilinogen. The lack of stercobilin and other bile pigments causes feces to become clay-colored.

=== Brown pigment gallstones ===
An analysis of two infants suffering from cholelithiasis observed that a substantial amount of stercobilin was present in brown pigment gallstones. This study suggested that brown pigment gallstones could form spontaneously in infants suffering from bacterial infections of the biliary tract.

== Role in treatment of disease ==
A 1996 study by McPhee et al. suggested that stercobilin and other related pyrrolic pigments — including urobilin, biliverdin, and xanthobilirubic acid — has potential to function as a new class of HIV-1 protease inhibitors when delivered at low micromolar concentrations. These pigments were selected due to a similarity in shape to the successful HIV-1 protease inhibitor Merck L-700,417 (N,N-bis(2-hydroxy-1-indanyl)-2,6-diphenylmethyl-4-hydroxy-1,7-heptandiamide). Further research is suggested to study the pharmacological efficacy of these pigments.

== See also ==
- Bile pigment
- Bilirubin
- Biliverdin
- Heme
- Urobilin
