= Urobilin =

Yellow pigment in urine

Names
- IUPAC name 3,3′-[(4S,16S)-3,18-Diethyl-2,7,13,17-tetramethyl-1,19-dioxo-1,4,5,15,16,19,22,24-octahydro-21H-biline-8,12-diyl]dipropanoic acid
- Systematic IUPAC name 3,3′-([1^{2}S,4(5^{2})Z,7^{2}S]-1^{3},7^{4}-Diethyl-1^{4},3^{3},5^{4},7^{3}-tetramethyl-1^{5},7^{5}-dioxo-1^{2},1^{5},7^{2},7^{5}-tetrahydro-1^{1}H,3^{1}H,7^{1}H-1,7(2),3,5(2,5)-tetrapyrrolaheptaphan-4(5^{2})-ene-3^{4},5^{3}-diyl)dipropanoic acid
- Other names Urochrome

Identifiers
CAS Number	1856-98-0
3D model (JSmol)	Interactive image
ChemSpider	4938471
ECHA InfoCard	100.015.870
MeSH	Urobilin
PubChem CID	6433298
UNII	G0OTH73Y0M
CompTox Dashboard (EPA)	DTXSID30883762
- InChI: InChI=1S/C33H42N4O6/c1-7-20-19(6)32(42)37-27(20)14-25-18(5)23(10-12-31(40)41)29(35-25)15-28-22(9-11-30(38)39)17(4)24(34-28)13-26-16(3)21(8-2)33(43)36-26/h15,26-27,35H,7-14H2,1-6H3,(H,36,43)(H,37,42)(H,38,39)(H,40,41)/b28-15-/t26-,27-/m0/s1 Key: KDCCOOGTVSRCHX-UYMYUHGCSA-N
- SMILES: CCC1=C(C(=O)N[C@H]1CC2=C(C(=C(N2)/C=C\3/C(=C(C(=N3)C[C@H]4C(=C(C(=O)N4)CC)C)C)CCC(=O)O)CCC(=O)O)C)C

Properties
Chemical formula	C_{33}H_{42}N_{4}O_{6}
Molar mass	590.721 g·mol^{−1}
- Except where otherwise noted, data are given for materials in their standard state (at 25 °C [77 °F], 100 kPa). verify (what is ?) Infobox references

Urobilin, also known as urochrome, is the chemical primarily responsible for the yellow color of urine. It is a linear tetrapyrrole compound that, along with the related colorless compound urobilinogen, are degradation products of the cyclic tetrapyrrole heme.

== Metabolism ==
Urobilin is generated from the degradation of heme, which is first degraded through biliverdin to bilirubin. Bilirubin is then excreted as bile, which is further degraded by microbes present in the large intestine to urobilinogen. The enzyme responsible for the degradation is bilirubin reductase, which was identified in 2024. Some of this remains in the large intestine, and its conversion to stercobilin gives feces their brown color. Some is reabsorbed into the bloodstream and then delivered to the kidneys. When urobilinogen is exposed to air, it is oxidized to urobilin, which has a yellow color.

== Importance ==
Many urine tests (urinalysis) monitor the amount of urobilin in urine, as its levels can give insight on the effectiveness of urinary tract function. Normally, urine would appear as either light yellow or colorless. A lack of water intake, for example following sleep or dehydration, reduces the water content of urine, thereby concentrating urobilin and producing a darker color of urine. Obstructive jaundice reduces biliary bilirubin excretion, which is then excreted directly from the blood stream into the urine, giving a dark-colored urine but with a paradoxically low urobilin concentration, no urobilinogen, and usually with correspondingly pale faeces. Darker urine can also be due to other chemicals, such as various ingested dietary components or drugs, porphyrins in patients with porphyria, and homogentisate in patients with alkaptonuria.

== See also ==
- Bile pigment
- Bilirubin
- Biliverdin
- Heme
- Stercobilin
- Urobilinogen
