= Urobilinogen =

Identifiers
CAS Number	14684-37-8
3D model (JSmol)	Interactive image
ChEBI	CHEBI:29026
ChemSpider	24980
ECHA InfoCard	100.131.280
EC Number	604-544-5
KEGG	C05790
PubChem CID	26818
UNII	PY8N5V3S0D
CompTox Dashboard (EPA)	DTXSID601105823
- InChI: InChI=1/C33H44N4O6/c1-7-20-19(6)32(42)37-27(20)14-25-18(5)23(10-12-31(40)41)29(35-25)15-28-22(9-11-30(38)39)17(4)24(34-28)13-26-16(3)21(8-2)33(43)36-26/h26-27,34-35H,7-15H2,1-6H3,(H,36,43)(H,37,42)(H,38,39)(H,40,41) Key: OBHRVMZSZIDDEK-UHFFFAOYSA-N
- SMILES: CCC1=C(C)C(=O)NC1CC1=C(C)C(CCC(O)=O)=C(CC2=C(CCC(O)=O)C(C)=C(CC3NC(=O)C(CC)=C3C)N2)N1

Properties
Chemical formula	C_{33}H_{44}N_{4}O_{6}
Molar mass	592.726 (g/mol)
- Except where otherwise noted, data are given for materials in their standard state (at 25 °C [77 °F], 100 kPa). verify (what is ?) Infobox references

Urobilinogen is a colorless by-product of bilirubin reduction. It is formed in the intestines by the bacterial enzyme bilirubin reductase. About half of the urobilinogen formed is reabsorbed and taken up via the portal vein to the liver, enters circulation and is excreted by the kidney.

Increased amounts of bilirubin are formed in hemolysis, which generates increased urobilinogen in the gut. In liver disease (such as hepatitis), the intrahepatic urobilinogen cycle is inhibited also increasing urobilinogen levels. Urobilinogen is converted to the yellow pigmented urobilin apparent in urine.

The urobilinogen in the intestine is directly reduced to brownish colour stercobilin, which gives the feces their characteristic color. It can also be reduced to stercobilinogen, which can then be further oxidized to stercobilin.

In biliary obstruction, below-normal amounts of conjugated bilirubin reach the intestine for conversion to urobilinogen. With limited urobilinogen available for reabsorption and excretion, the amount of urobilin found in the urine is low. High amounts of the soluble conjugated bilirubin enter the circulation where they are excreted via the kidneys. These mechanisms are responsible for the dark urine and pale stools observed in biliary obstruction.

Low urine urobilinogen may result from complete obstructive jaundice or treatment with broad-spectrum antibiotics, which destroy the intestinal bacterial flora (obstruction of bilirubin passage into the gut or failure of urobilinogen production in the gut).

Low urine urobilinogen levels may result from congenital enzymatic jaundice (hyperbilirubinemia syndromes) or from treatment with drugs that acidify urine, such as ammonium chloride or ascorbic acid.

Elevated levels may indicate hemolytic anaemia (excessive breakdown of red blood cells RBC), overburdening of the liver, increased urobilinogen production, re-absorption (via a large hematoma), restricted liver function, hepatic infection, poisoning or liver cirrhosis.

== Nomenclature ==
Urobilinogen (a.k.a. D-urobilinogen) is closely related to two other compounds: mesobilirubinogen (I-urobilinogen) and stercobilinogen (L-urobilinogen). Specifically, urobilinogen can be reduced to form mesobilirubinogen, and mesobilirubinogen can be further reduced to form stercobilinogen. Confusingly, however, all three of these compounds are frequently collectively referred to as "urobilinogens".

== Measurement ==
Urobilinogen content is determined by a reaction with Ehrlich's reagent, which contains para-dimethylaminobenzaldehyde and may be measured in Ehrlich units. Ehrlich's reagent reacts with urobilinogen to give a pink-red color. One Ehrlich unit is equal to one milligram of urobilinogen per deciliter of sample (1 mg/dL).

== See also ==
- Urobilin
