= Urinalysis =

Array of tests performed on urine

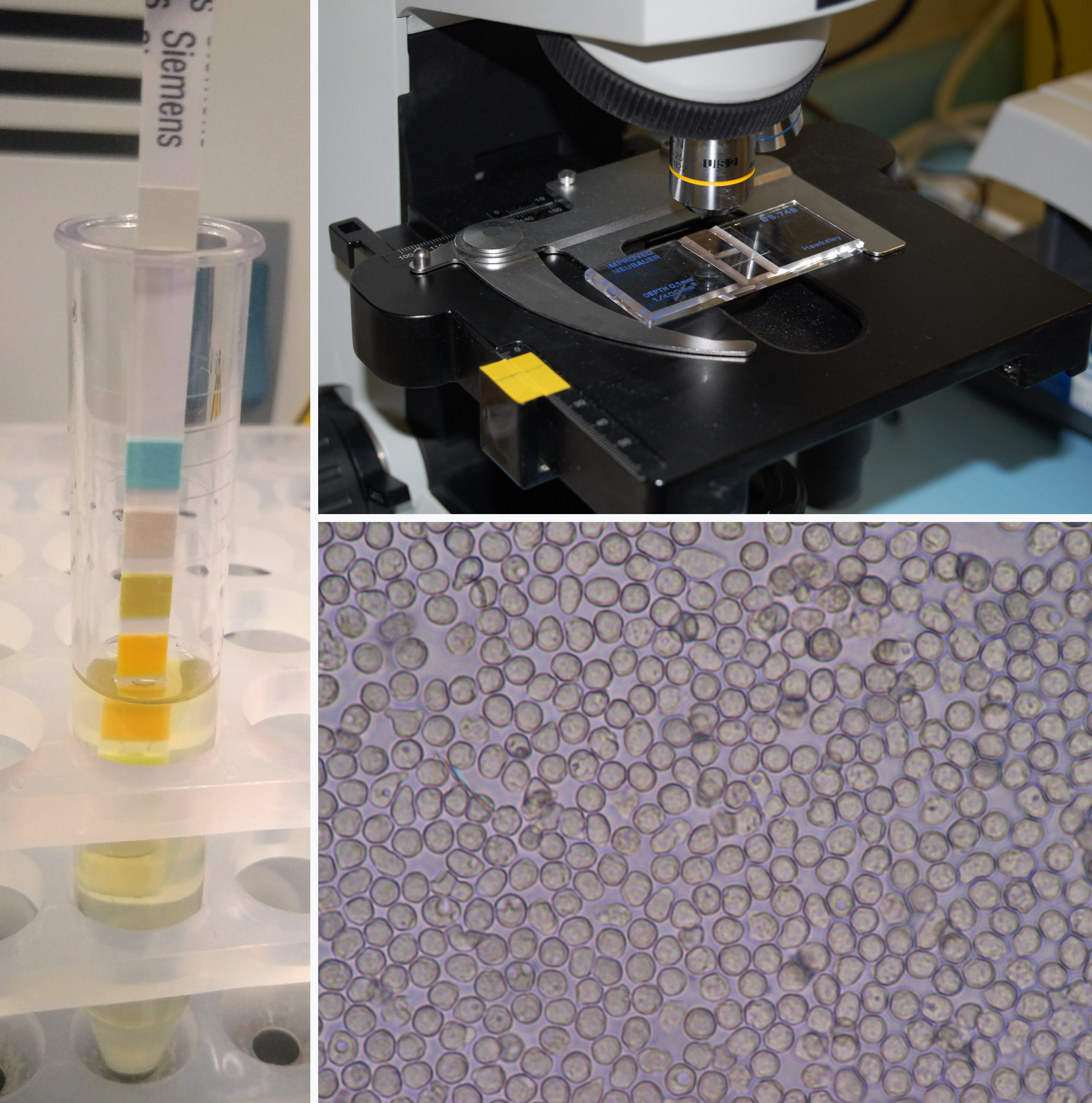
- Procedures in urinalysis. Left: A urine test strip is immersed into the sample. Top right: Urine is about to be examined under a phase-contrast microscope using a Neubauer counting chamber. Bottom right: Phase-contrast microscopic image showing many white blood cells in the urine (pyuria).
- MeSH: D016482
- Other codes: LOINC Codes for Urinalysis panels
- MedlinePlus: 003579

Urinalysis, a portmanteau of the words urine and analysis, is a panel of medical tests that includes physical (macroscopic) examination of the urine, chemical evaluation using urine test strips, and microscopic examination. Macroscopic examination targets parameters such as color, clarity, odor, and specific gravity; urine test strips measure chemical properties such as pH, glucose concentration, and protein levels; and microscopy is performed to identify elements such as cells, urinary casts, crystals, and organisms.

== Background ==
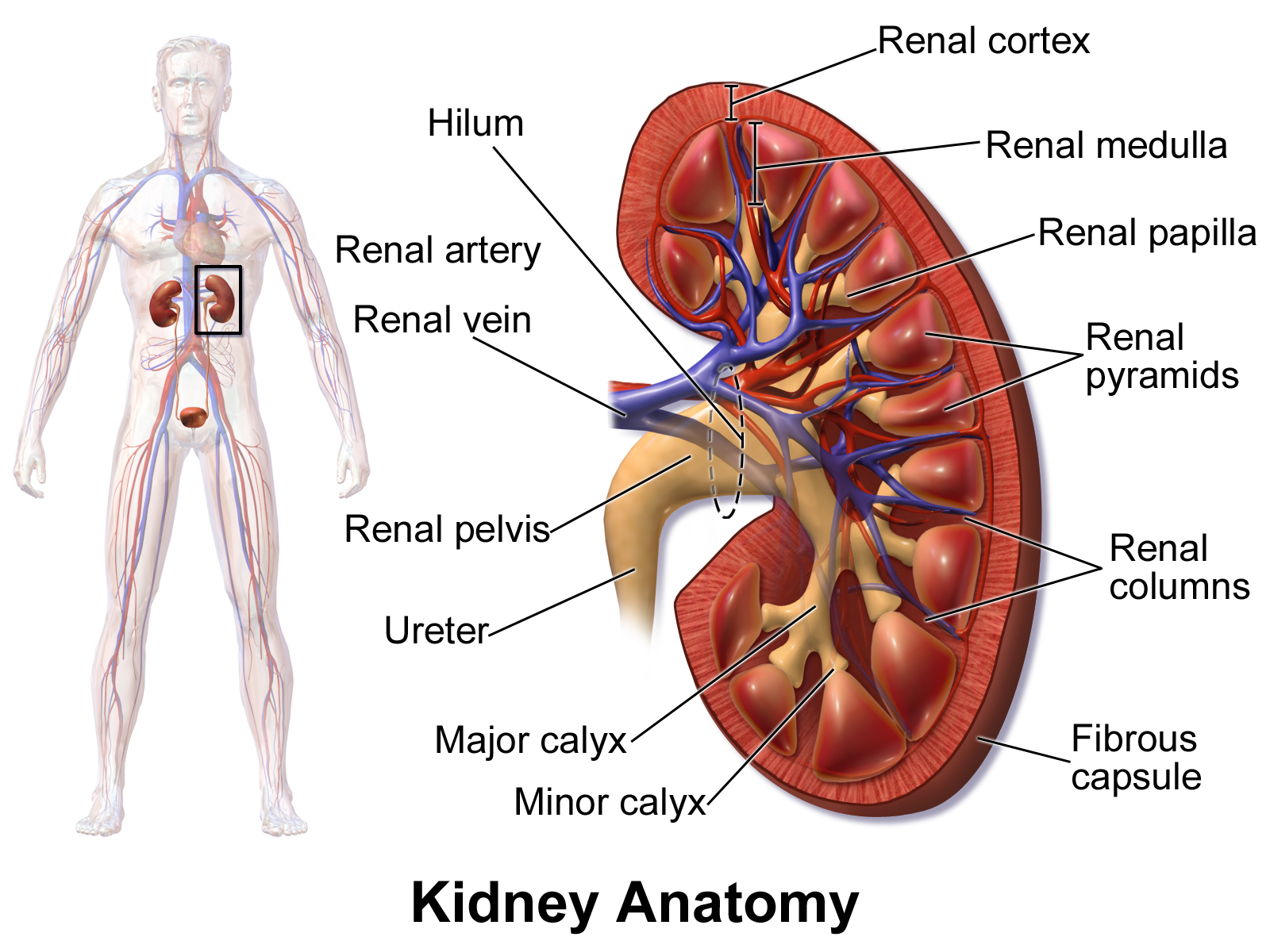
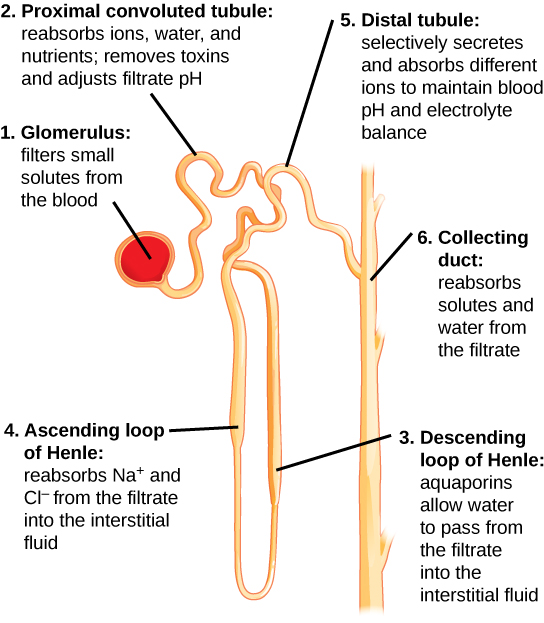
Structure of the kidney and nephron

Urine is produced by the filtration of blood in the kidneys. The formation of urine takes place in microscopic structures called nephrons, about one million of which are found in a normal human kidney. Blood enters the kidney though the renal artery and flows through the kidney's vasculature into the glomerulus, a tangled knot of capillaries surrounded by Bowman's capsule. The glomerulus and Bowman's capsule together form the renal corpuscle. A healthy glomerulus allows many solutes in the blood to pass through, but does not permit the passage of cells or high-molecular weight substances such as most proteins. The filtrate from the glomerulus enters the capsule and proceeds to the renal tubules, which reabsorb water and solutes from the filtrate into the circulation and secrete substances from the blood into the urine in order to maintain homeostasis.

The first destination is the proximal convoluted tubule. The filtrate proceeds into the loop of Henle, then flows through the distal convoluted tubule to the collecting duct. The collecting ducts ultimately drain into the renal calyces, which lead to the renal pelvis and the ureter. Urine flows through the ureters into the bladder and exits the body through the urethra.

Besides excreting waste products, the process of urine formation helps to maintain fluid, electrolyte and acid-base balance in the body. The composition of urine reflects not only the functioning of the kidneys, but numerous other aspects of the body's regulatory processes. The ease with which a urine sample can be obtained makes it a practical choice for diagnostic testing.

== Medical uses ==
Urinalysis involves assessment of the physical properties of urine, such as color and clarity; chemical analysis using urine test strips; and microscopic examination. Test strips contain pads impregnated with chemical compounds that change color when they interact with specific elements in the sample, such as glucose, protein and blood, and microscopic examination permits the counting and classification of solid elements of the urine, such as cells, crystals, and bacteria.

Urinalysis is one of the most commonly performed medical laboratory tests. It is frequently used to help diagnose urinary tract infections and to investigate other issues with the urinary system, such as incontinence. It may be used to screen for diseases as part of a medical assessment. The results can suggest the presence of conditions such as kidney disease, liver disease and diabetes. In emergency medicine urinalysis is used to investigate numerous symptoms, including abdominal and pelvic pain, fever, and confusion. During pregnancy, it may be performed to screen for protein in the urine (proteinuria), which can be a sign of pre-eclampsia, and bacteria in the urine, which is associated with pregnancy complications. The analysis of urine is invaluable in the diagnosis and management of kidney diseases.

== Specimen collection ==
Samples for urinalysis are collected into a clean (preferably sterile) container. The sample can be collected at any time of the day, but the first urine of the morning is preferred because it is more concentrated. To prevent contamination, a "midstream clean-catch" technique is recommended, in which the genital area is cleaned before urinating and the sample is collected partway through the urination. Samples can also be collected from a urinary catheter or by inserting a needle through the abdomen and into the bladder (suprapubic aspiration). In infants and young children, urine may be collected into a bag attached to the genital region, but this is associated with a high risk of contamination. If the sample is not tested promptly, inaccurate results can occur because bacteria in the urine will multiply and elements such as cells and casts will degrade. It is recommended that urinalysis is performed within two hours of sample collection if the urine is not refrigerated.

== Macroscopic examination ==
=== Color and clarity ===
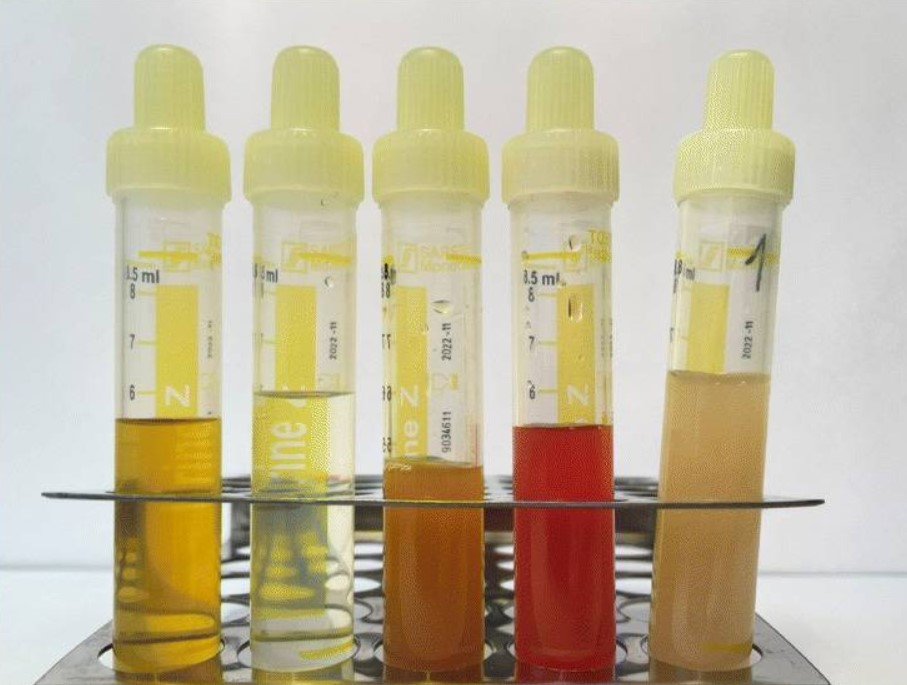
Urine samples of varying color and clarity

Normal urine has a yellow hue, which is primarily caused by the pigment urochrome. The color can range from pale yellow to amber based on the individual's hydration status. Urine can develop a variety of abnormal colors, which may suggest disease in some cases. A total lack of color indicates that the urine is extremely dilute, which may be caused by excessive fluid intake, diabetes insipidus, or diabetes mellitus. Dark yellow-brown to green urine may suggest a high concentration of bilirubin, a state known as bilirubinuria. Red urine often indicates the presence of red blood cells or hemoglobin, but can also be caused by some medications and the consumption of foods containing red pigments, such as beets. Myoglobin, a product of muscle breakdown, can give urine a red to reddish-brown color. Dark brown or black urine can occur in a genetic disorder called alkaptonuria and in people with melanoma. Purple urine occurs in purple urine bag syndrome.

A spectrum of abnormal colors can result from the intake of drugs. An unusually bright yellow color can occur after consumption of B vitamin supplements, while phenazopyridine, used to treat urinary tract-related pain, can turn the urine orange. Methylene blue may turn it blue to bluish-green. Phenolphthalein, a stimulant laxative previously found in Ex-Lax, can produce colors ranging from red to purple, and levodopa, used to treat Parkinson's disease, may result in "cola-colored" urine.

The clarity of urine is also recorded during urinalysis. Urine is typically clear; materials such as crystals, cells, bacteria, and mucus can impart a cloudy appearance. A milky appearance can be caused by a very high concentration of white blood cells or fats, or by chyluria (the presence of lymphatic fluid in the urine). Unpreserved urine will become cloudier over time.

=== Smell ===
The odor (scent) of urine can normally vary from odorless (when very light colored and dilute) to a much stronger odor when the subject is dehydrated and the urine is concentrated. Transient changes in urine odor can occur after consuming certain foods, most notably asparagus. The urine of diabetics experiencing ketoacidosis (urine containing high levels of ketone bodies) may have a fruity or sweet smell, while urine from individuals with urinary tract infections often has a foul smell. Some inborn errors of metabolism cause characteristic odors, such as maple syrup urine disease (which takes its name from the urine scent) and phenylketonuria (which causes a "mousey" smell). Odor is rarely reported during urinalysis.

=== Specific gravity ===
Specific gravity is a measure of the concentration of the urine, which provides information about hydration status and kidney function. It normally ranges from 1.003 to 1.035; lower values indicate that the urine is dilute, while higher values mean that it is concentrated. A urine specific gravity that consistently remains around 1.010 (isosthenuria) can indicate kidney damage, as it suggests that the kidneys have lost the ability to control urine concentration. It is not possible for the kidneys to produce urine with a specific gravity greater than 1.040 but such readings can occur in urine that contains high-molecular weight substances, such as contrast dyes used in radiographic imaging. Specific gravity is commonly measured with urine test strips, but refractometers may also be used. Reagent strip readings are based on the concentration of ions in the sample, while refractometer readings are affected by other substances such as glucose and protein.

== Urine test strip ==
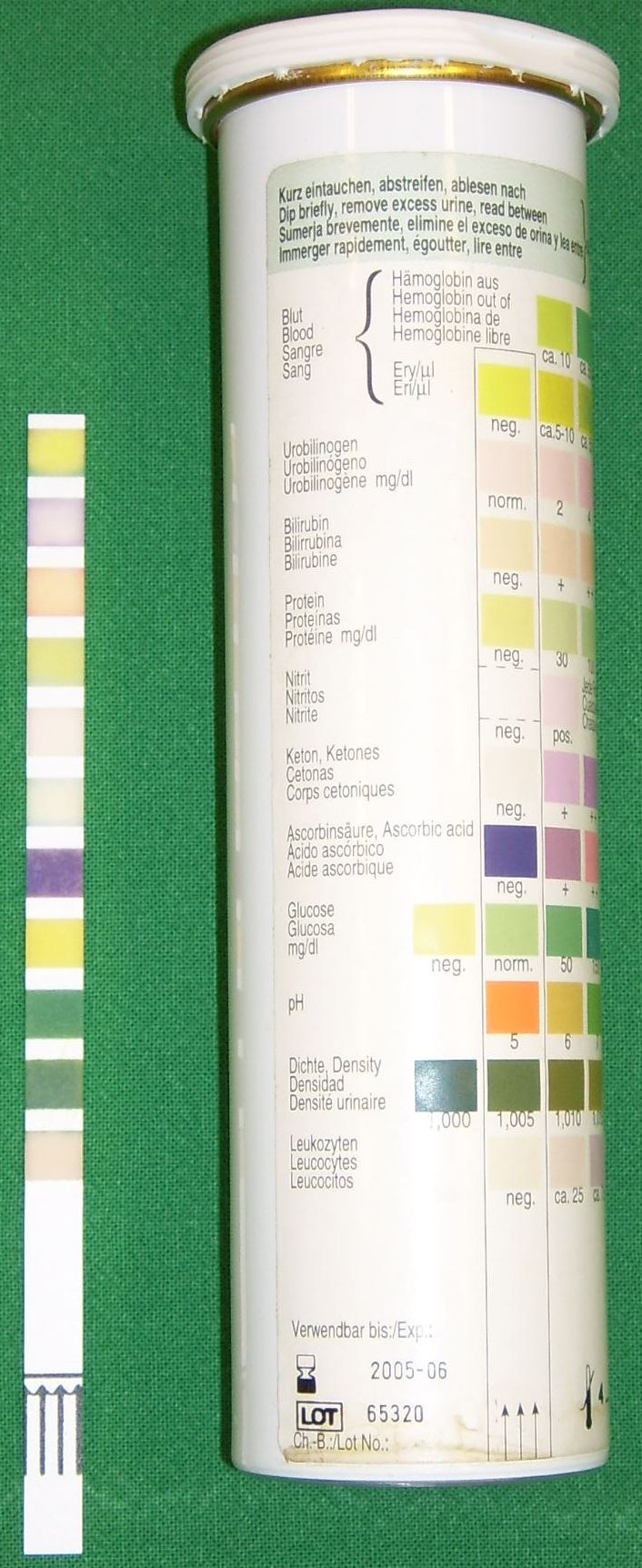
A urine test strip is compared against a color chart to determine the results.

Urine test strips or "dipsticks" allow for the rapid measurement of numerous urine parameters and substances. The strip is dipped into the urine sample and the color changes on the reagent pads are read after a defined period of time, either by eye or using an automated instrument. The tests included vary depending on the type of dipstick, but common ones are glucose, ketones, bilirubin, urobilinogen, blood, white blood cells (leukocyte esterase), protein, nitrite, pH, and specific gravity. Nitrite is reported as negative or positive; other elements may be scored on a scale or reported as an approximate concentration based on the intensity of the color change.

False positive and false negative results may occur. General sources of error include abnormally colored urine, which interferes with the interpretation of color changes; high levels of ascorbic acid (Vitamin C), which can cause false negative results for blood, bilirubin, glucose, and nitrite; and variations in the concentration of the sample.

=== Blood ===
Reagent pads for blood change color in the presence of heme groups, which catalyze the reaction of hydrogen peroxide with the color indicator in the test strip. Heme groups are found in hemoglobin, but also in myoglobin (a product of muscle breakdown). Thus, a positive result for blood can represent the presence of red blood cells (hematuria), free hemoglobin (hemoglobinuria), or myoglobin (myoglobinuria). Red blood cells can sometimes be distinguished from free hemoglobin or myoglobin as the former causes a speckled pattern on the test pad while the latter results in a uniform color change.

=== White blood cells ===
Leukocyte esterase, an enzyme found in granulocytes, is measured to estimate the concentration of white blood cells. The action of the enzyme on chemicals in the test pad ends in the creation of a purple azo dye. False positive results can occur if the sample is contaminated with vaginal secretions; false negatives can occur in very concentrated samples or those containing high levels of glucose and protein. Elevated white blood cell counts in urine generally indicate infection or inflammation. People with a low level of neutrophils in the blood (neutropenia) may not have enough white blood cells in their urine to produce a positive reaction.

=== Nitrite ===
Some bacteria that cause UTIs can reduce urinary nitrates to nitrites. The presence of nitrites, which causes a pink color on the reagent strip pad, therefore acts as an indicator of urinary tract infection. The nitrite test is quite specific, meaning that someone is likely to have a UTI if it is positive, but it is not sensitive; a negative result does not reliably indicate that the subject does not have a UTI. Not all bacteria that cause UTIs produce nitrite, and because it takes time for the chemical reaction to occur, the test is best performed on urine that has been in the bladder overnight. A diet low in vegetables can lead to low nitrate levels in the urine, meaning that nitrites cannot be produced. False positive results can occur in samples that are contaminated or stored improperly, allowing bacteria to multiply.

=== Protein ===
Test strips estimate urine protein levels by exploiting the ability of protein to interfere with pH indicators. The reagent pad contains an indicator that is buffered to a pH of 3, which changes from yellow to green in the presence of protein. Trace levels of protein in the urine can be normal, but high levels (proteinuria) can indicate kidney disease. Most cases of proteinuria are caused by increased levels of albumin, which test strips can detect relatively well; but they are markedly less sensitive to other proteins, such as Bence-Jones protein, which may occur in multiple myeloma. Because the test pad reaction is dependent on pH, false positive results can occur if the urine is highly alkaline. Conventional test strips are not sensitive enough to reliably detect microalbuminuria, a condition in which urine albumin levels are slightly elevated, although dipsticks specialized for this measurement exist.

=== pH ===
pH indicators are used to measure the pH of the sample. Urine pH varies with diet and a wide range of values occur in healthy subjects, although it is most commonly slightly acidic. Because the kidneys are involved in regulating acid-base balance, the urine is typically acidic in people with metabolic or respiratory acidosis and alkaline in those with alkalosis. However, in renal tubular acidosis, the urine pH remains alkaline while the blood is acidic. During urinary tract infections, waste products of bacterial metabolism can cause the urine to become alkaline. Urine pH may be monitored to help prevent the formation of kidney stones or to avoid side effects of some drugs, such as high-dose methotrexate therapy, in which crystals that cause kidney damage can form if the urine is acidic. If microscopy is performed, knowing the pH of the sample helps to identify any crystals that might be present.

=== Specific gravity ===
Urine test strips use the concentration of ions in the urine to estimate specific gravity. The test pad contains a polyelectrolyte that releases hydrogen ions in proportion to the concentration of ions in the sample. The consequent pH change is measured using a pH indicator. The reading obtained from reagent strips, as opposed to refractometers, is not affected by substances such as glucose, urea and contrast dyes. Falsely low readings can occur in alkaline urine.

=== Glucose ===
Test strips for glucose contain the enzyme glucose oxidase, which breaks down glucose and forms hydrogen peroxide as a byproduct. In the presence of a peroxidase enzyme, hydrogen peroxide reacts with a chromogen to induce a color change. The presence of glucose in the urine is known as glycosuria. In people with normal blood sugar levels, the amount of glucose in the urine should be negligible as it is reabsorbed by the renal tubules. High blood sugar levels (hyperglycemia) cause excess glucose to spill over into the urine and result in a positive reading. This characteristically occurs in diabetes mellitus (although it is not part of the formal diagnostic criteria). Glycosuria may occur in people with normal blood sugar levels during pregnancy or due to dysfunction of the renal tubules (termed renal glycosuria).

=== Ketones ===
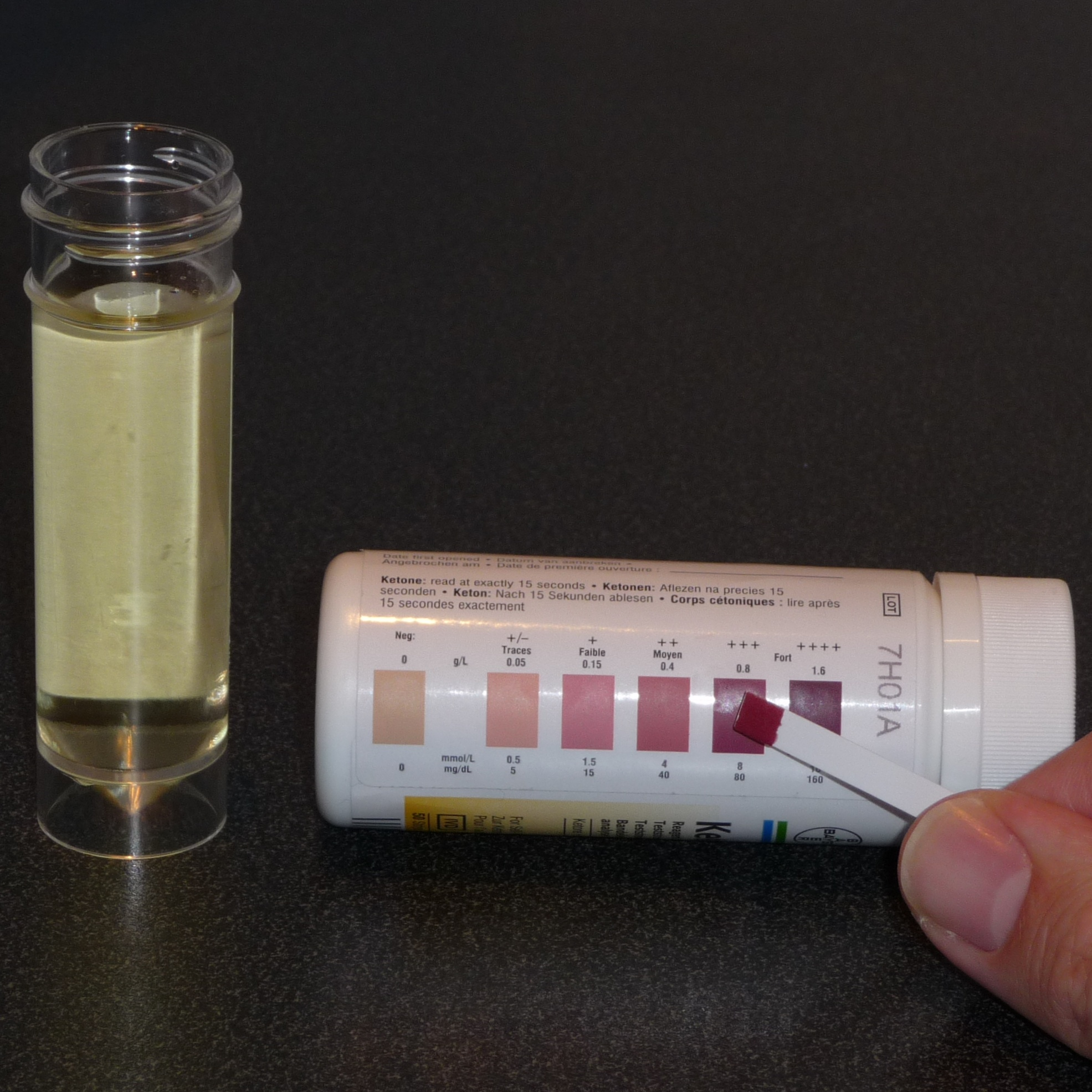
Positive result on a Ketostix test strip, which is specialized for measuring ketones

Ketone bodies are products of fat breakdown. When the body relies on fats, rather than carbohydrates, as its main energy source, increased levels of ketones occur in the blood and urine. The presence of detectable levels of ketones in the urine is called ketonuria. Ketones occur in three forms in the body: beta-hydroxybutyrate (BHB), acetone and acetoacetate. Test strips use sodium nitroprusside to detect acetoacetate, and those with a glycine additive can detect acetone; however, none detect BHB. The reaction of ketones with sodium nitroprusside in an alkaline medium turns the test pad purple.

Ketonuria occurs in uncontrolled type 1 diabetes and in diabetic ketoacidosis. Ketonuria can also occur when the body's demand for carbohydrates outpaces dietary intake, such as in people following a ketogenic diet, people experiencing severe vomiting or diarrhea, and during starvation or after strenuous exercise. Mild ketonuria can be normal during pregnancy. Some medications, such as levodopa or methyldopa, can cause a false positive result.

=== Bilirubin ===
Bilirubin is a waste product formed from the breakdown of hemoglobin. Cells of the mononuclear phagocyte system digest aged red blood cells and release unconjugated bilirubin into the bloodstream, which is converted to water-soluble conjugated bilirubin by the liver. Conjugated bilirubin is normally stored in the gallbladder as a constituent of bile and is excreted through the intestines; it does not occur at detectable levels in the urine.

The presence of bilirubin in the urine (termed bilirubinuria) occurs as a consequence of high blood levels of conjugated bilirubin in liver disease or bile duct obstruction. Bilirubin is detected by means of reaction with a diazonium salt that forms a colored complex. With prolonged light exposure, bilirubin converts to biliverdin and becomes undetectable by reagent strips.

=== Urobilinogen ===
Urobilinogen refers to a group of compounds produced from bilirubin by the intestinal flora. Under normal conditions, most of the urobilinogen produced is absorbed into the bloodstream and secreted into the bile by the liver, or excreted in the feces as stercobilin and other compounds. A small fraction is excreted in the urine.

Urine urobilinogen is increased in liver disease and hemolytic jaundice (jaundice due to increased destruction of red blood cells); in the latter case, urine bilirubin is typically negative. In bile duct obstruction, urine bilirubin increases but urobilinogen is normal or decreased, as bilirubin cannot reach the intestines to be converted to urobilinogen. Testing methods are based on the Ehrlich reaction of urobilinogen with para-dimethylaminobenzaldehyde, or interaction with a diazonium compound to produce a colored product. Test strips that use Ehrlich's reagent can give false positive results in the presence of porphobilinogen and numerous drugs. Decreased levels of urobilinogen cannot be detected by the dipstick method. Like bilirubin, urobilinogen is sensitive to light.

== Microscopic examination ==
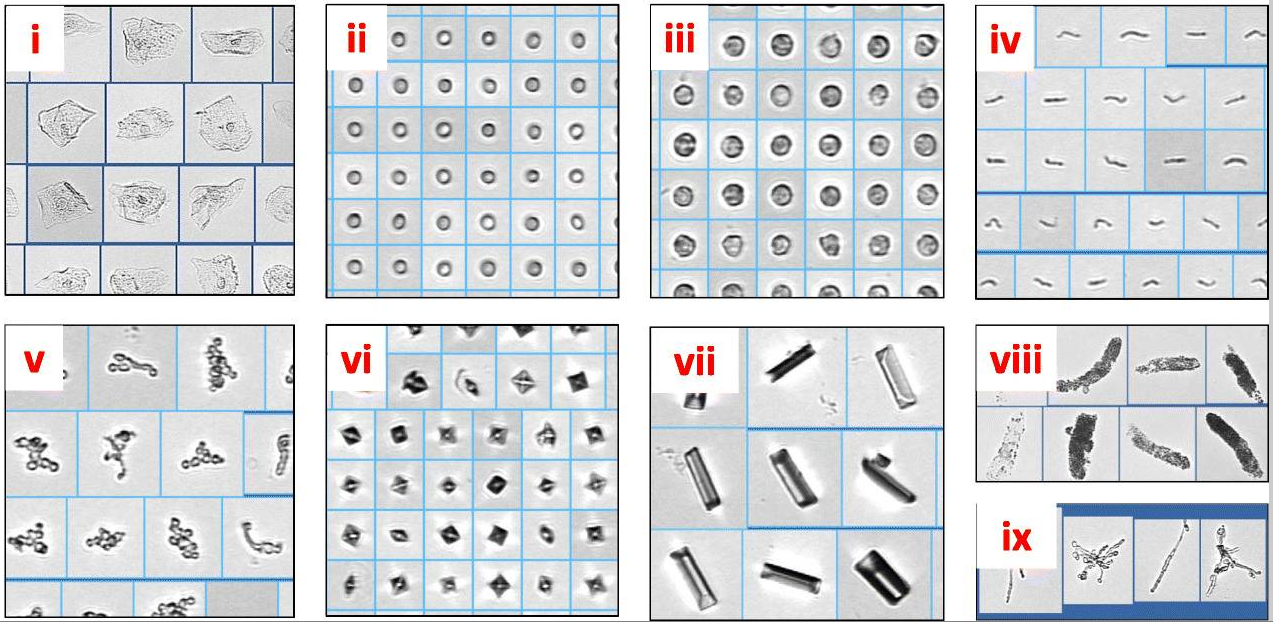
Microscopic view of various elements of the urine; (i) squamous epithelial cells, (ii) red blood cells, (iii) white blood cells, (iv) bacteria, (v) yeast, (vi) calcium oxalate crystals, (vii) triple phosphate crystals, (viii) granular casts, and (ix) yeast with pseudohyphae

Microscopic examination of the urine allows cells and elements such as urinary casts to be identified and counted. This can yield a great detail of information and may suggest a specific diagnosis. Microscopy is not always included in urinalysis: it may be reserved for samples that have abnormal results on preliminary testing or that are from certain patient populations, such as infants. Results that typically require microscopic examination include abnormal color or clarity and positive dipstick results for blood, leukocytes, nitrite, or protein.

If microscopy is necessary, the urine may be centrifuged to concentrate the solid elements so that they can be viewed more easily. In this case, a drop of the concentrated sample is placed under a coverslip and examined, typically at 100x and 400x magnification. The microscopic components of urine are reported according to the amount present in the microscope's field of view at low magnification (reported as /lpf, meaning low-power field) and high magnification (/hpf for high-power field). Some elements, such as crystals or bacteria, are typically reported in a qualitative format, using terms such as "few" or "many" or grades from 1+ to 4+. Others, such as cells or casts, are reported using numerical ranges. If it is necessary to determine the exact number of cells or casts in the sample, unconcentrated urine can be placed in a counting chamber called a hemocytometer. In this case, the results are reported per microliter (/μL). Urine is traditionally examined by light microscopy, but some laboratories use phase-contrast microscopes, which improve the visualization of elements such as urinary casts and mucus. Urine can also be stained before analysis to make its components easier to identify.

There are automated microscopy systems that use flow cytometry technology or pattern recognition to identify microscopic elements in unconcentrated urine. Automated instruments reduce workload in medical laboratories and can accurately identify most common urinary elements, but do not perform as well with unusual findings such as transitional and renal epithelial cells, abnormal casts and rare crystals.

Elements that can be observed on microscopic examination include:

=== Red blood cells ===
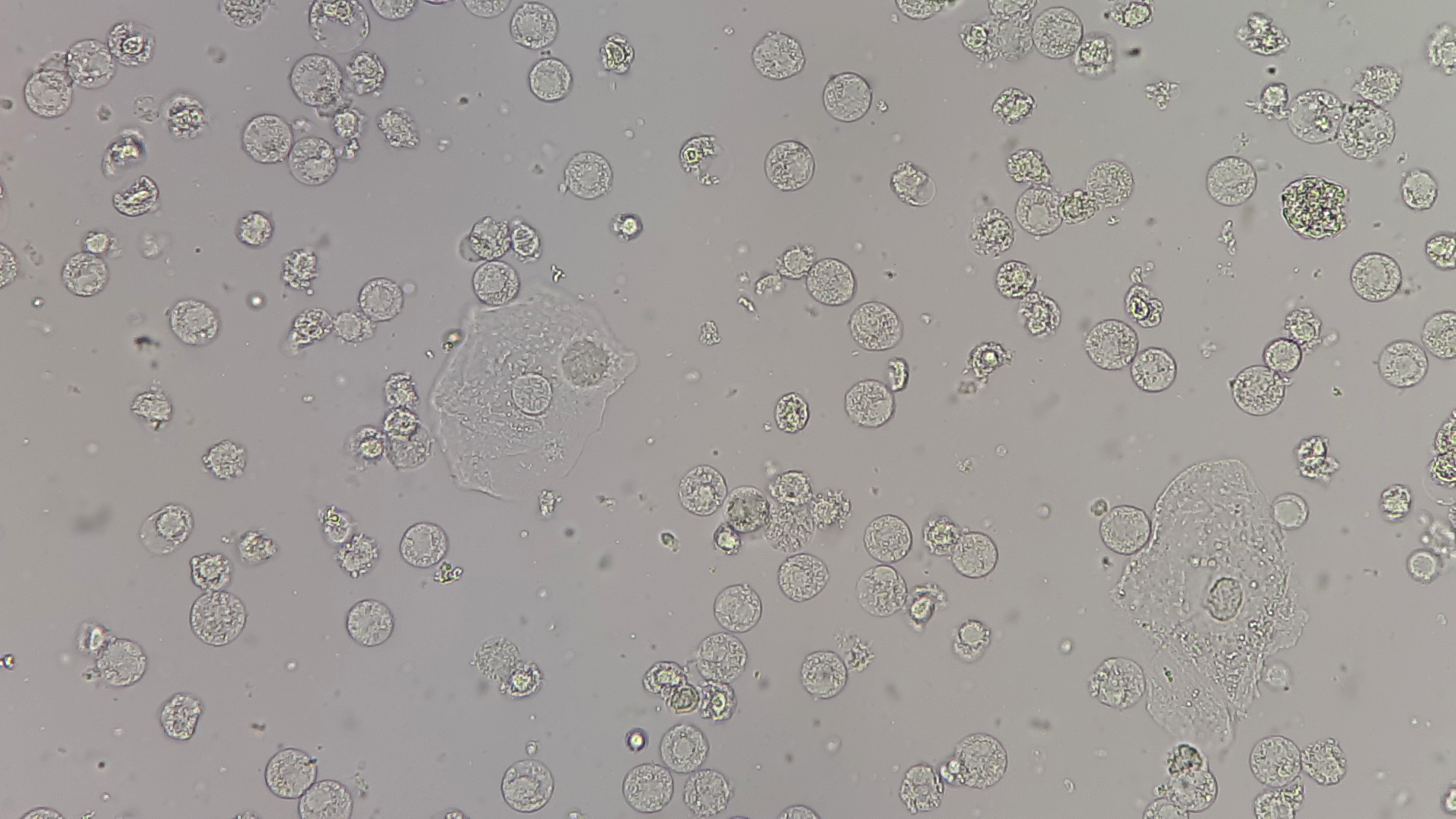
Light microscopy image showing squamous epithelial cells, white blood cells, and red blood cells in urine. Bacteria are also visible.

Under the microscope, normal red blood cells (RBCs) appear as small concave discs. Their numbers are reported per high-power field. In highly concentrated urine they may shrivel and develop a spiky shape, which is termed crenation, while in dilute urine they can swell and lose their hemoglobin, creating a faint outline known as a ghost cell. A small quantity of red blood cells in the urine is considered normal.

An increased level of RBCs is termed hematuria. Microscopic hematuria is sometimes observed in healthy people after exercise or as a consequence of contamination of the sample with menstrual blood. Pathologic causes of hematuria are diverse and include trauma to the urinary tract, kidney stones, urinary tract infections, drug toxicity, genitourinary cancers, and a variety of other renal and systemic diseases. Abnormally shaped red blood cells with blob-like protrusions of the cell membrane, called dysmorphic RBCs, are thought to represent damage to the glomerulus.

=== White blood cells ===
Typically, most white blood cells (WBCs) in urine are neutrophils. They are round, larger than RBCs, possess a cell nucleus, and have a granular appearance. A few white blood cells can normally be found in the urine of healthy individuals; females tend to have slightly more than males. An increased number of WBCs is termed pyuria or leukocyturia and is associated with infection or inflammation of the urinary tract. WBCs can also appear in the urine following exercise or fever. An increased number of eosinophils (eosinophiluria) can occur in acute interstitial nephritis and chronic UTIs. Cytocentrifugation and staining of the urine sample is necessary to reliably distinguish eosinophils from neutrophils.

=== Epithelial cells ===
Epithelial cells form the lining of the urinary tract. Three types may occur in urine: squamous epithelial cells, transitional epithelial cells and renal tubular epithelial cells. Some laboratories do not distinguish between the three types of cells and simply report "epithelial cells" in general.

Squamous epithelial cells line the urethra, as well as the vagina and the outer layer of the skin. They are very large, flat, and thin, with irregular borders and a single, small nucleus. They may fold into various shapes. They are not considered clinically significant, but if they are seen in large numbers they can indicate contamination of the sample by vaginal secretions or the skin of the urogenital area.

Transitional epithelial cells, also known as urothelial cells, line the urinary tract from the renal pelvis through the ureters and bladder and, in males, the upper (proximal) portion of the urethra. They are smaller than squamous cells and their shape varies based on the layer of epithelium from which they are derived, but they are most commonly round or pear-shaped. They may have one or two nuclei. Small numbers of these cells are found in normal urine; larger numbers can be seen after invasive procedures like catheterization or cystoscopy or in conditions that irritate the urinary tract, such as urinary tract infections. In the absence of recent trauma to the urinary tract, clusters and sheets of transitional cells in the urine may indicate malignancy, requiring further investigation.

Renal tubular epithelial cells (RTEs) line the collecting ducts and the distal and proximal tubules of the kidney. They can be difficult to identify in unstained urine, as they look similar to urothelial cells and WBCs; however, they are generally larger than WBCs and smaller than urothelial cells, and collecting duct cells, unlike urothelial cells, often have a flat edge. The presence of RTEs in high numbers is a significant finding, as this indicates damage to the renal tubules. This may occur in conditions such as acute tubular necrosis, drug or heavy metal toxicity, acute glomerulonephritis, kidney transplant rejection, trauma, and sepsis.

=== Casts ===
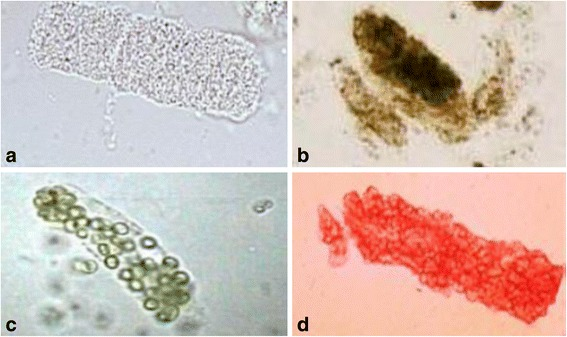
Examples of urinary casts: a) RTE cell cast, b) "muddy" granular cast, c) white blood cell cast, d) red blood cell cast

Urinary casts are cylindrical structures composed of Tamm-Horsfall glycoprotein. Their shape derives from the renal tubules where they are formed, and the protein base can incorporate cells or other material. Hyaline casts contain only protein and can be found in low numbers in healthy people; their numbers may increase transiently after exercise or dehydration. Persistently increased numbers are seen in many renal diseases. They are almost transparent and can be difficult to see using light microscopy.

Granular casts, so named for their microscopic appearance, incorporate degenerated cellular material or protein aggregates. They are considered an abnormal finding and are associated with diseases of the kidney although they can rarely occur in healthy individuals, particularly following strenuous physical activity. Large, dense casts with cracked edges, called waxy casts, are traditionally associated with chronic kidney failure, though little evidence exists to support this. Red blood cell casts incorporate intact RBCs and are a serious finding because under normal conditions, RBCs cannot pass through the glomerulus into the renal tubules. These casts are characteristically found in people with glomerular diseases such as acute glomerulonephritis and lupus nephritis. White blood cell casts represent infection or inflammation involving the kidneys; they can occur in pyelonephritis, but are absent in lower urinary tract infections. Following injury to the renal tubules, renal tubular epithelial cell casts may be seen in the urine. Casts may incorporate a variety of other materials such as bacteria, yeast, crystals, and pigments like bilirubin or myoglobin.

=== Crystals ===
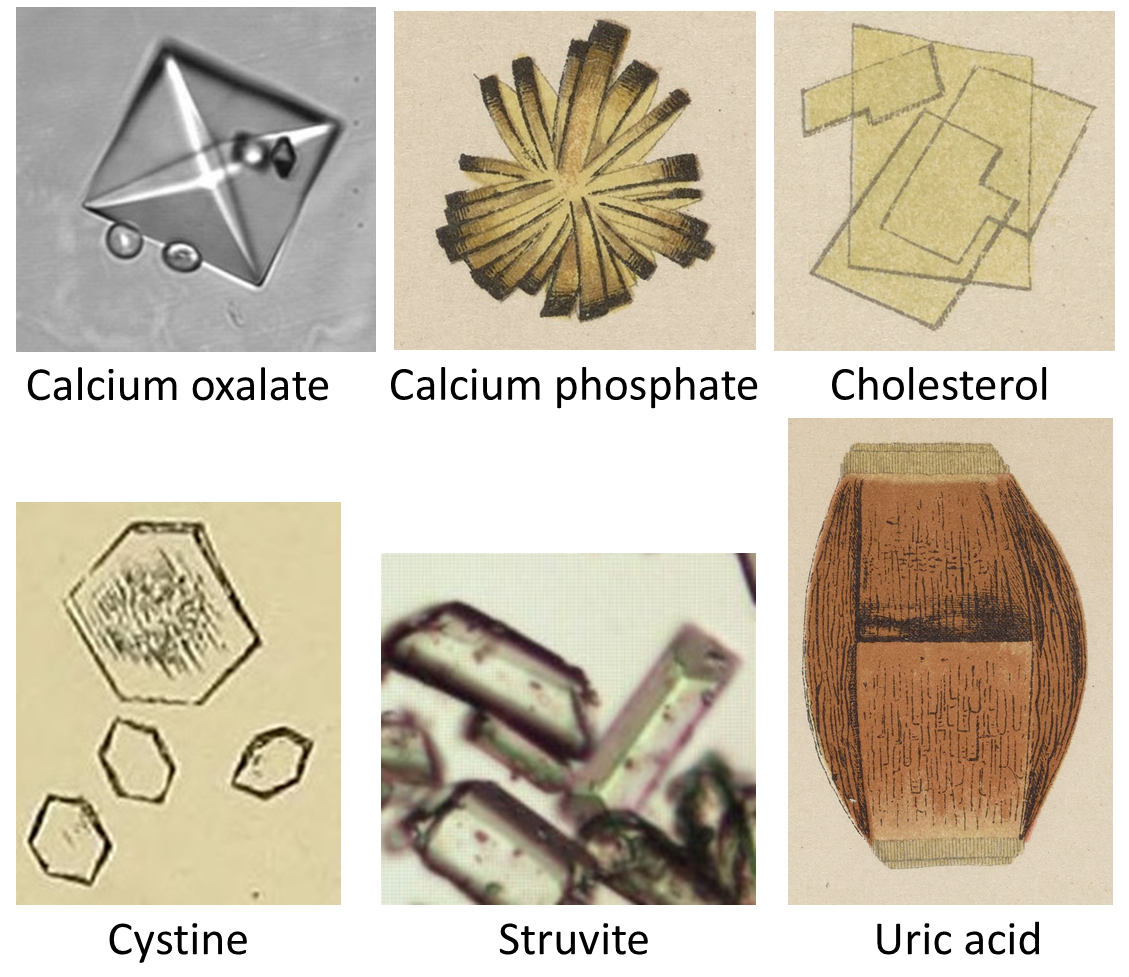
Comparison of different types of urine crystals.

Various compounds in the urine can precipitate to form crystals. Crystals can be identified based on their appearance and the pH of the urine (many types preferentially form at an acidic or alkaline pH). Crystals that can be found in normal urine include uric acid, monosodium urate, triple phosphate (ammonium magnesium phosphate), calcium oxalate, and calcium carbonate. Crystals can also appear as poorly defined aggregates of granular material, termed amorphous urates or amorphous phosphates (urates form in acid urine while phosphates form in alkaline urine). These are of no clinical significance, but they can interfere with microscopy by obscuring other elements (especially bacteria). Some drugs, such as sulfonamides, may form crystals when excreted in the urine, and ammonium biurate crystals commonly occur in aged samples.

The presence of crystals in the urine has conventionally been associated with the formation of kidney stones, and crystalluria is more common in people with kidney stones than those without. However, crystalluria occurs in up to 20% of the normal population, so it is not a reliable diagnostic marker. Some types of crystals are characteristically associated with disease states. Leucine and tyrosine crystals may be observed in liver disease, and cystine crystals indicate cystinuria (although they look identical to hexagonal variants of uric acid crystals, and can only be distinguished with further testing). Cholesterol crystals may rarely be seen in nephrotic syndrome and chyluria.

=== Organisms ===
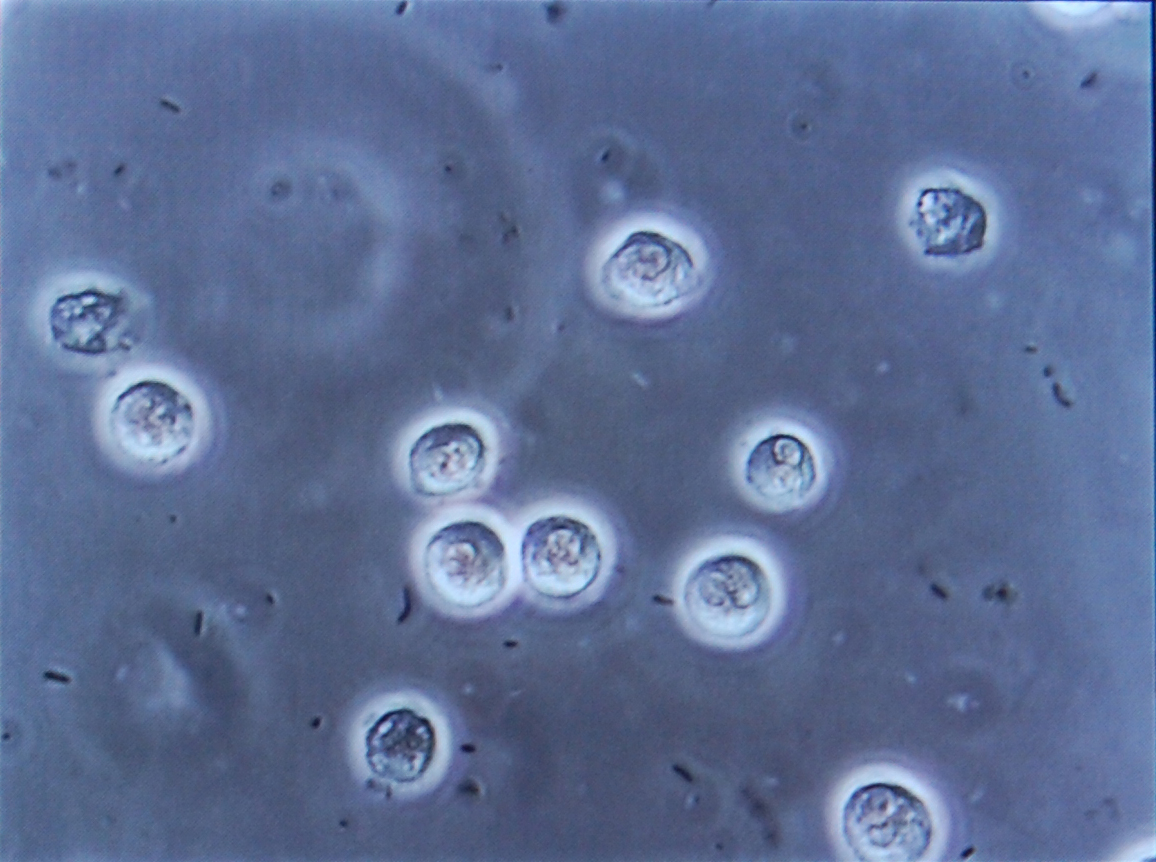
Phase-contrast microscopic image showing many bacteria and white blood cells in the urine. These changes suggest a urinary tract infection.

Microorganisms that can be observed in the urine include bacteria, yeast and Trichomonas vaginalis. The urine of children with pinworm infections may contain Enterobius vermicularis eggs, and Schistosoma haematobium ova may be detected in urine samples from individuals with parasitic infestations.

=== Other elements ===
Mucus can occur in the urine, where it appears as translucent wavy strands under the microscope. The presence of mucus is not a clinically significant finding, but it can be confused with hyaline casts. Sperm may occasionally be observed in the urine of both males and females; in female children and vulnerable adults, this can indicate sexual abuse. Reporting the presence of sperm in human urine (spermaturia), especially in women, is a controversial topic. Fat droplets and oval fat bodies may be present in a condition called lipiduria, which has various causes, most notably nephrotic syndrome. Contaminants from the outside environment, such as starch granules, hair, and clothing fibers, may be seen but are not reported.

== Interpretation ==
Example of reference values for dipstick urinalysis
Test	Result
Blood	Negative
Leukocytes	Negative
Nitrite	Negative
Protein	Negative to trace
pH	5–7
Specific gravity	1.003–1.035
Glucose	Negative
Ketones	Negative
Bilirubin	Negative
Urobilinogen	<1 mg/dL

The interpretation of urinalysis takes into account the results of physical, chemical and microscopic examination and the person's overall condition. Urine test results should always be interpreted using the reference range provided by the laboratory that performed the test, or using information provided by the test strip/device manufacturer. Not all abnormal results signify disease, and false positive results are common. For this reason, the use of urinalysis for screening in the general population has been discouraged, but it remains a common practice.

Urinalysis is commonly used to help diagnose urinary tract infections, but the significance of the results depends on the broader clinical situation. In the setting of UTI symptoms, positive dipstick results for nitrite and leukocyte esterase are strongly suggestive of a UTI, but negative results do not rule it out if there is a high degree of suspicion. When the dipstick test is positive, microscopy is used to confirm and count WBCs, RBCs and bacteria and assess for possible contamination (signified by a high number of squamous epithelial cells in the sample). If UTI is suspected, particularly in complicated cases or when urinalysis results are inconclusive, a urine culture may be performed to identify microorganisms if present, obtain a colony count, and carry out antibiotic sensitivity testing. The colony count helps to distinguish between contamination and infection.

If a significant quantity of bacteria is present in the urine but there are no symptoms of a UTI, the condition is called asymptomatic bacteriuria. Asymptomatic bacteriuria is common in elderly people and in those with long-term urinary catheters, and in most cases does not require treatment. Exceptions include pregnant women, in whom bacteriuria is associated with poorer pregnancy outcomes, and people undergoing some invasive urology procedures.

A positive dipstick result for blood could signify the presence of red blood cells, hemoglobin, or myoglobin, and therefore requires microscopic analysis for confirmation. Intact red blood cells will normally be observed under the microscope if present, but they may lyse in dilute or alkaline samples. Hemoglobinuria, if unaccompanied by a high quantity of RBCs, can signify intravascular hemolysis (destruction of red blood cells inside the body). Myoglobinuria occurs in rhabdomyolysis and other conditions that cause breakdown of muscle tissue.

If red blood cells are present, the interpretation takes into account whether the urine is visibly bloody (termed macroscopic hematuria) or if RBCs are only seen on microscopy (microscopic hematuria). Contamination of the sample with blood from a non-urinary source, such as from menstruation or rectal bleeding, can mimic hematuria, and microscopic hematuria is sometimes observed in healthy people after exercise. Other causes of microscopic hematuria include UTI, kidney stones, benign prostatic hyperplasia, and trauma to the urinary tract. Kidney diseases that affect the glomerulus can cause microscopic hematuria, in which case it is referred to as glomerular hematuria. On urine microscopy, the presence of abnormally shaped ("dysmorphic") red blood cells and RBC casts is associated with glomerular hematuria. Proteinuria and elevated blood creatinine alongside hematuria suggests kidney dysfunction. In people at risk, persistent microscopic hematuria can be a sign of urinary tract cancer and may require further testing, such as urinary tract imaging and cystoscopy. Sometimes no cause can be identified, and the condition is managed with regular monitoring. The causes of macroscopic hematuria are similar, but in the absence of an obvious explanation such as trauma or UTI, it is more strongly associated with malignancy and requires further investigation.

Elevated levels of protein in the urine are often suggestive of kidney disease, but may have other causes. Proteinuria can occur transiently as a consequence of exercise, fever, stress, or UTI. Proteinuria that occurs only while standing, called orthostatic proteinuria, is relatively common in young men and not associated with disease. In multiple myeloma, Bence-Jones protein may be secreted into the urine, although this type of proteinuria is not as easily detected by urine dipsticks. If proteinuria is persistently detected by dipstick testing, a 24-hour urine collection can be performed to obtain an accurate measurement of protein levels; alternatively, protein excretion can be estimated from the urine protein/creatinine ratio of a single specimen. Measuring the amount of protein in the urine helps to distinguish between different causes of proteinuria. Urine protein electrophoresis, which identifies and measures the proportions of different types of protein in the urine, may be used to investigate the cause of proteinuria and to detect Bence-Jones protein. During pregnancy, dipstick testing may be used to screen for proteinuria as it is a sign of pre-eclampsia.

== History ==
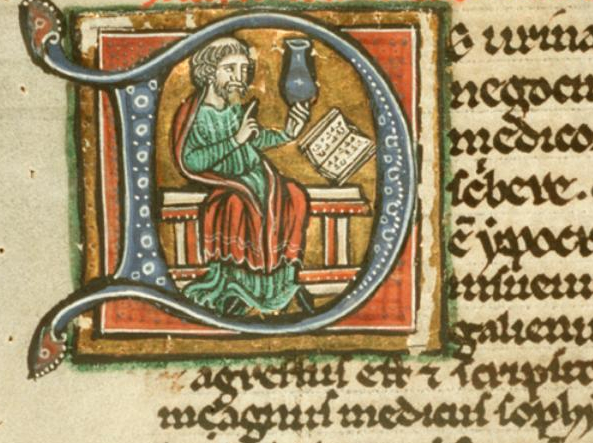
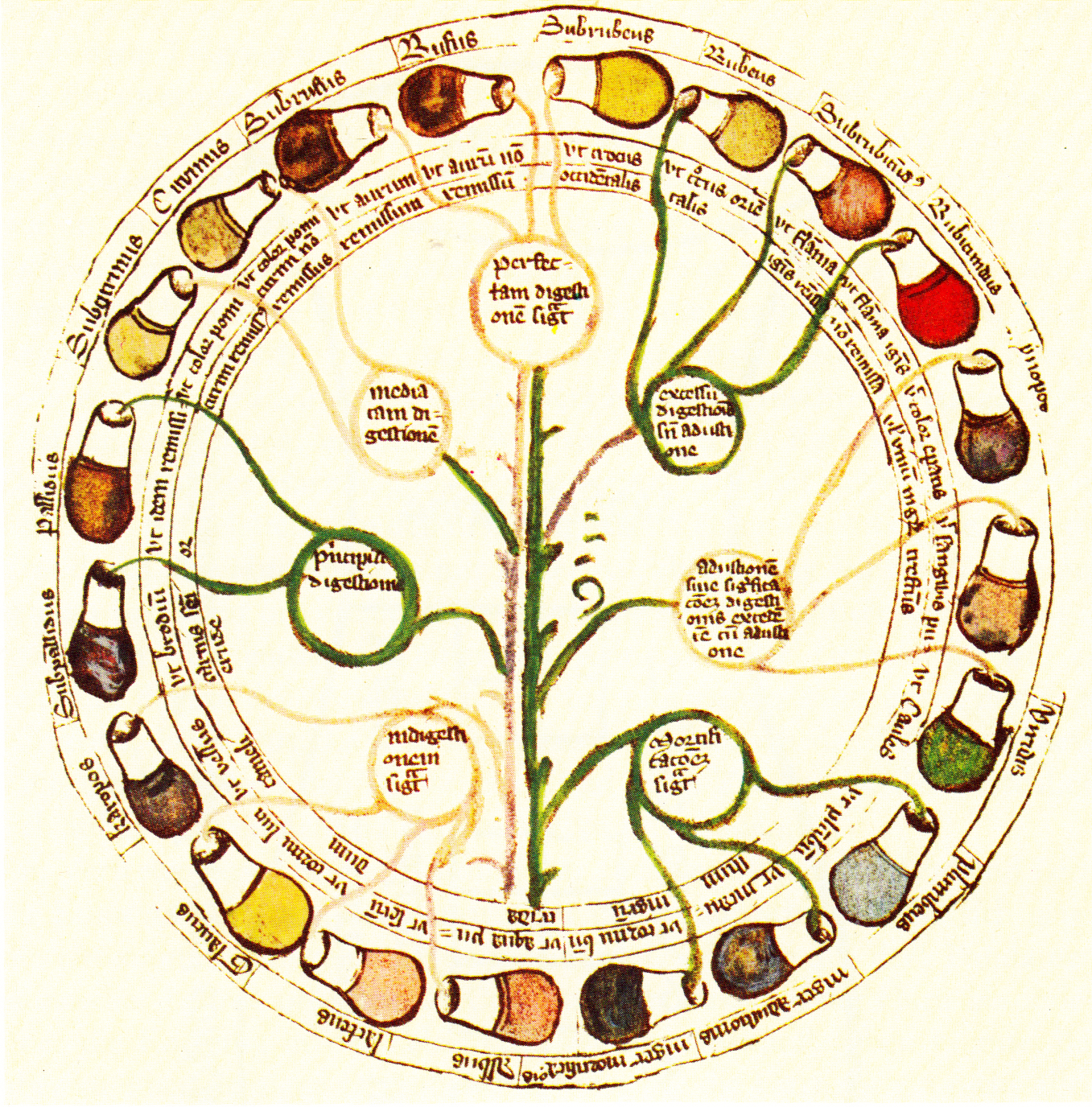
Left: Theophilus Protospatharius holding a blue-gray uroscopy flask, depicted in a 13th-century manuscript. Right: Urine color wheel from Fasciculus Medicinae published by Johannes de Ketham (1491).

The diagnostic value of urine has been recognized since ancient times. Urine examination was practiced in Sumer and Babylonia as early as 4000 BC, and is described in ancient Greek and Sanskrit texts. Hippocrates, Celsus and Galen published important works correlating the characteristics of urine with patients' health. During the Middle Ages the visual inspection of urine―termed uroscopy—gained widespread popularity. The 7th-century manuscript De Urinis by the Byzantine physician Theophilus Protospatharius is thought to be the earliest publication dedicated solely to the examination of urine. Protospatharius notably described a method for precipitating protein out of urine using heat.

Many influential works on urine testing followed. Publications by Isaac Judaeus built upon Protospatharius' work, and Zayn al-Din Gorgani, an 11th-century Persian physician, published instructions for specimen collection which noted that urine samples were affected by aging and exposure to heat and light. Other medieval writers included Gilles de Corbeil, who published a popular mnemonic poem on uroscopy and introduced the matula, a round flask used to examine urine; and Joannes Actuarius, who wrote a series of books on uroscopy in seven volumes. The 1491 book Fasciculus Medicinae, published by Johannes de Ketham, became popular with laypeople and was used for self-diagnosis. The matula came to symbolize the practice of medicine in general.

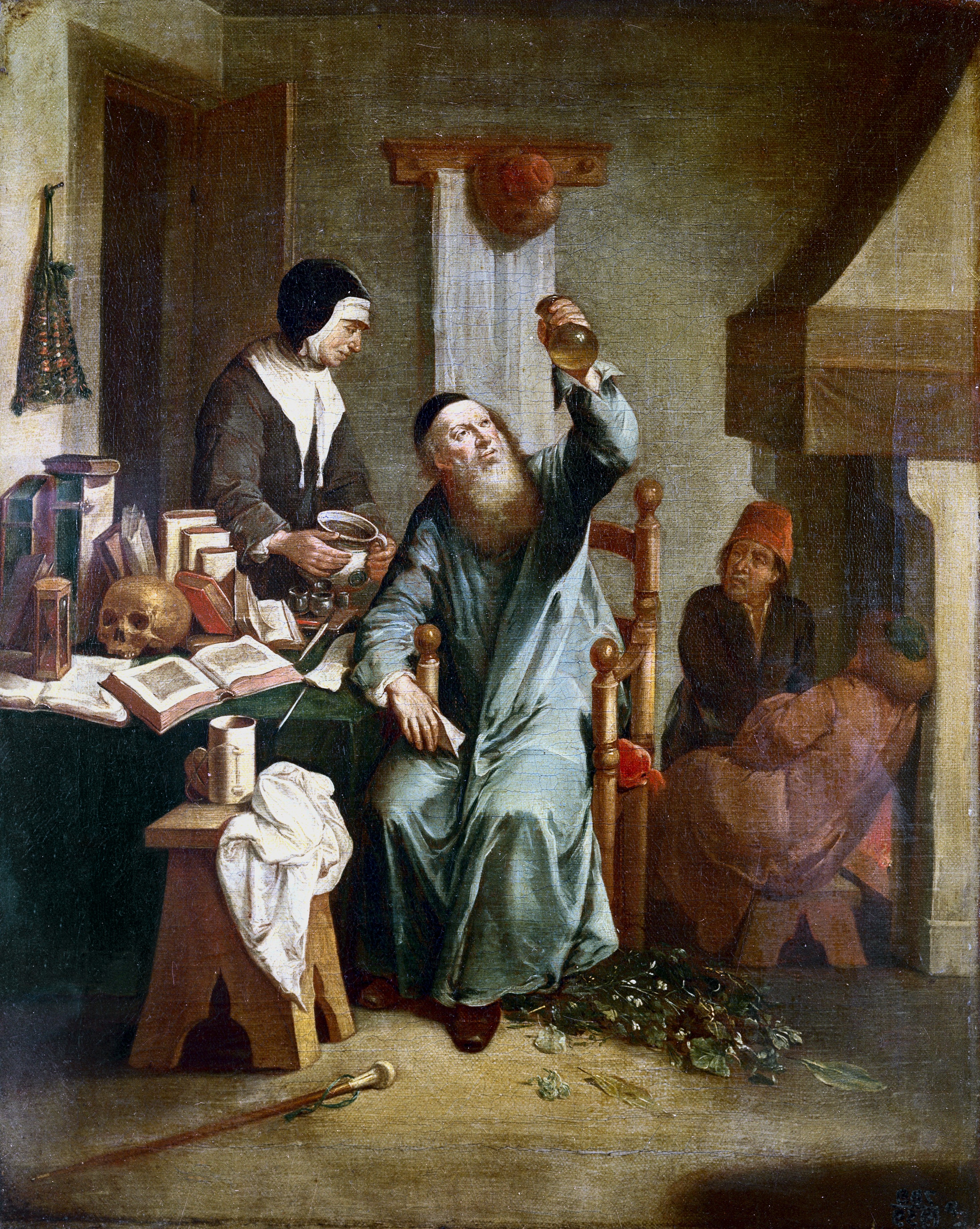
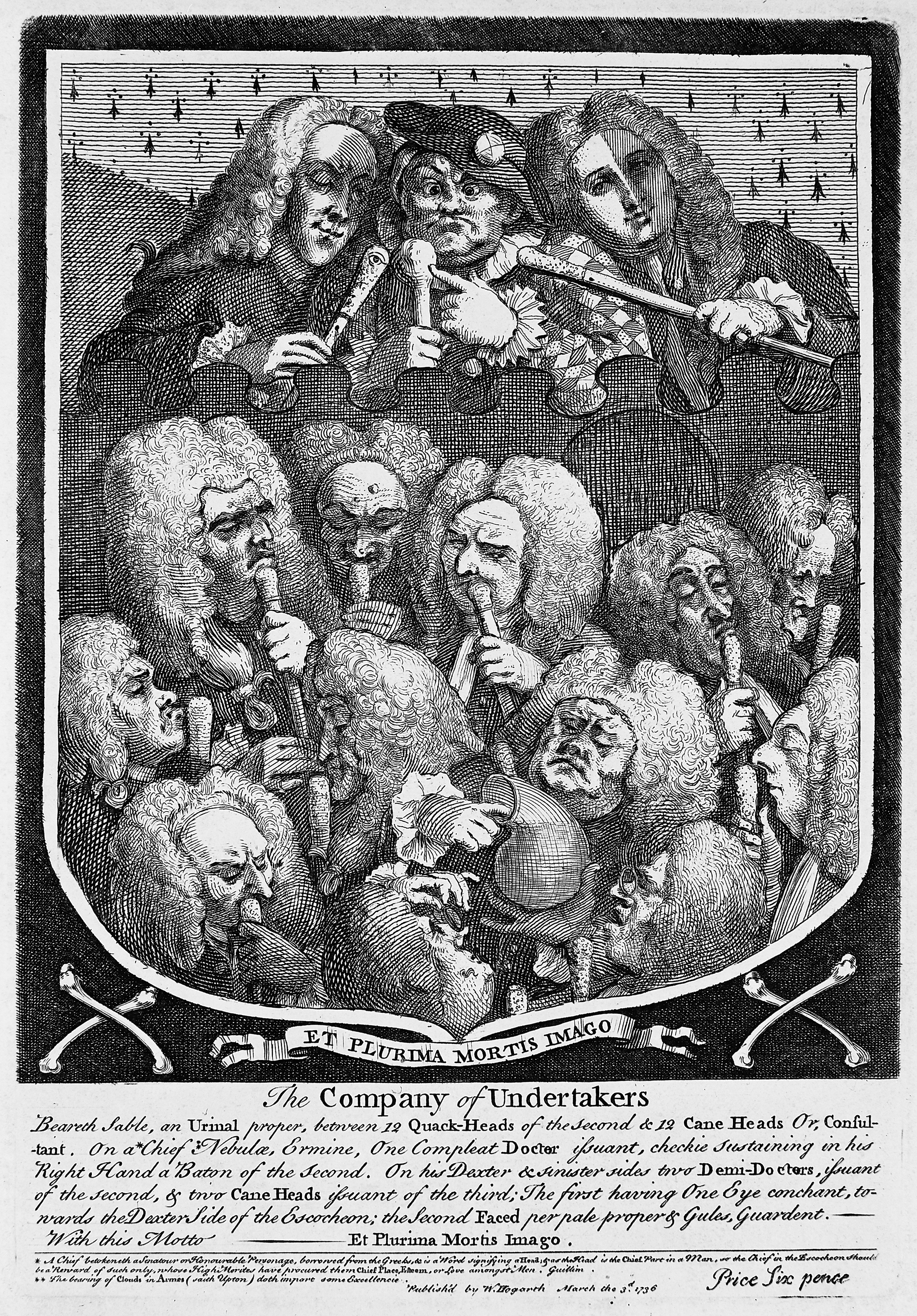
Left: A physician examining a urine-flask brought by a woman; oil painting after Caspar Netscher (1639–1684). Right: The Company of Undertakers, a satirical 1736 engraving by William Hogarth depicting various forms of quackery. A man holding a urine flask appears in the lower right.

Physicians of antiquity interpreted the color of urine using circular charts listing correspondences with disease states. The relation of urine characteristics to disease was based on the theory of the four humors. Different areas of the matula flask were thought to represent different organs and regions of the human body. In the 16th century, Paracelsus applied the principles of alchemy to the study of urine. He believed that materials obtained from distillation and precipitation of the urine could provide diagnostic information. In this respect he could be regarded as a progenitor of biochemical methods for urinalysis.

During the late Middle Ages and the Renaissance, the abuse of uroscopy by disreputable individuals began to draw criticism. "Uromancers" without medical training claimed that they could not only diagnose disease, but detect pregnancy, determine a baby's sex, and even predict the future from a subject's urine. In 1637 the English physician Thomas Brian published The Pisse-Prophet, or, Certaine Pisse-Pot Lectures, excoriating those who claimed to be able to diagnose diseases by uroscopy without examining the patient.

The 19th century saw a proliferation in chemical methods for the analysis of urine, but these techniques were labor-intensive and impractical; in one contemporary editorial a physician complained about the dangers of keeping nitric acid (used to detect albumin) in one's pocket. A search for more convenient techniques ensued. An early method resembling urine test strips was devised by the French chemist Edme-Jules Maumené in 1850. Maumené impregnated a strip of wool with tin(II) chloride, added a drop of urine, and exposed it to a flame. If the urine contained glucose, the wool would turn black. In the 1880s William Pavy developed powdered reagents for urinalysis, and George Oliver introduced "Urinary Test Papers" for albumin and glucose, which were a commercial success and were marketed in Germany as well as the United Kingdom. From 1900 onwards there was a proliferation of commercial reagent kits for urinalysis. Beginning in the 1920s, the chemist Fritz Feigl developed highly sensitive methods for spot testing on filter paper, which paved the way for modern urine test strips. Feigl also introduced the method of protein detection using the protein error of indicators, which is still used today.

In 1956 Helen Murray Free and her husband developed Clinistix (also known as Clinistrip), the first dip-and-read test for glucose in urine for patients with diabetes. This breakthrough led to additional dip-and-read tests for other substances. The invention was named a National Historic Chemical Landmark by the American Chemical Society in May 2010. A dipstick test for urine protein, called Albustix, was introduced by Miles Laboratories in 1957, and the first multi-test dipsticks were released in 1959. Automated test strip readers came onto the market in the 1980s.

== See also ==
- Uroscopy, the ancient form of this analysis
- Urinary casts
- Proteinuria
- Urine test strip
- Urine collection device
- Pregnancy test, measures hCG levels in urine

== Works cited ==
- Bain, B.J. (2015). Blood Cells: A Practical Guide (5 ed.). John Wiley & Sons. ISBN 978-1-118-81733-9.
- Brunzel, N.A. (2018). Fundamentals of Urine and Body Fluid Analysis (4 ed.). Elsevier. ISBN 978-0-323-37479-8.
- Haber, M.H.; Blomberg, D.; Galagan, K.; Glassy, E.F.; Ward, P.C.J. (2010). Color Atlas of the Urinary Sediment: An Illustrated Field Guide Based on Proficiency Testing. College of American Pathologists. ISBN 978-0-930304-87-4.
- Hoffman, Karl Berthold; Ultzmann, Robert (1886). Analysis of the urine. New York: D. Appleton and company. LCCN 07000368.
- McPherson, R.A.; Pincus, M.R. (2017). Henry's Clinical Diagnosis and Management by Laboratory Methods (23 ed.). Elsevier Health Sciences. ISBN 978-0-323-41315-2.
- Mundt, L.A.; Shanahan, K. (2016). Graff's Textbook of Urinalysis and Body Fluids (3 ed.). Wolters Kluwer. ISBN 978-1-4963-2016-2.
- Ovalle, W.K.; Nahirney, P. (2021). Netter's Essential Histology (3 ed.). Elsevier. ISBN 978-0-323-69464-3.
- Partin, A.W.; Dmochowski, R.R.; Kavoussi, L.R.; Peters, C.A. (2021). Campbell-Walsh-Wein Urology. Elsevier. ISBN 978-0-323-54642-3.
- Rakel, R.E.; Rakel, D.P. (2016). Textbook of Family Medicine (9 ed.). Elsevier. ISBN 978-0-323-23990-5.
- Rifai, N.; Horvath, A.R.; Wittwer, C.T. (2018). Tietz Textbook of Clinical Chemistry and Molecular Diagnostics (6 ed.). Elsevier. ISBN 978-0-323-35921-4.
- Rosenfeld, L. (1999). Four Centuries of Clinical Chemistry. Taylor & Francis. ISBN 90-5699-645-2.
- Sharp, V.J.A.; Antes, L.M.; Sanders, M.L.; Lockwood, G.M. (2020). Urine Tests: A Case-Based Guide to Clinical Evaluation and Application. Springer. ISBN 978-3-030-29138-9.
- Turgeon, M.L. (2016). Linné & Ringsrud's Clinical Laboratory Science: Concepts, Procedures, and Clinical Applications (7 ed.). Elsevier Mosby. ISBN 978-0-323-22545-8.
- Walls, R.; Hockberger, R.; Gausche-Hill, M. (2017). Rosen's Emergency Medicine - Concepts and Clinical Practice (9 ed.). Elsevier Health Sciences. ISBN 978-0-323-39016-3.
- Van Leeuwen, A.M.; Bladh, M.L. (2019). Davis's Comprehensive Manual of Laboratory and Diagnostic Tests with Nursing Implications (8 ed.). F. A. Davis Company. ISBN 978-0-8036-9448-4.
