= Pyuria =

Presence of pus in urine

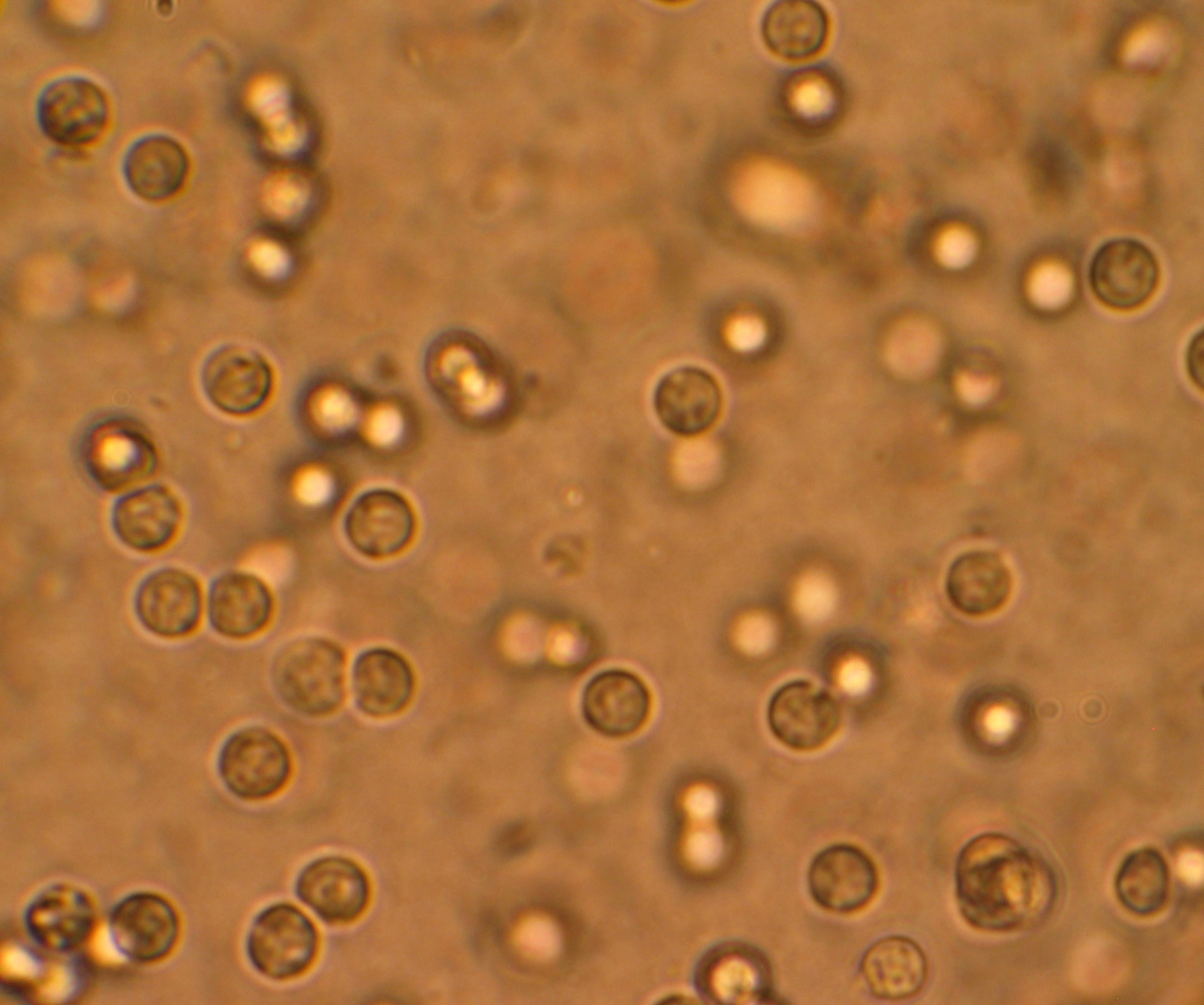
- White blood cells seen under a microscope from a urine sample.
- Pronunciation: /ˌpaɪjʊəˈriːə/
- Specialty: Urology

Pyuria is the condition of urine containing white blood cells or pus. Defined as the presence of 6–10 or more neutrophils per high power field of unspun, voided mid-stream urine, it can be a sign of a bacterial urinary tract infection. Pyuria may be present in people with sepsis, or in older people with pneumonia. Others additionally require discoloration, clouding or change in the smell of urine for a pyuria to be present. Without these additional features, there is said to be leukocyturia.

Sterile pyuria is urine which contains white blood cells while appearing sterile by standard culturing techniques. It is often caused by sexually transmitted infections, such as gonorrhea, or viruses which will not grow in bacterial cultures. Sterile pyuria is listed as a side effect from some medications such as paracetamol (acetaminophen). Its occurrence is also associated with certain disease processes, such as Kawasaki disease and genitourinary tuberculosis. However, there are many known causes, including systemic or infectious disease, structural and physiological reasons, intrinsic kidney pathology, or drugs.

== Leukocyturia ==
Under normal conditions, fewer than two million leukocytes are expelled in urine per day. A number greater than two million is called leucocyturia and can be determined when determining the Addis count.

However, this method requires a 24-hour urine collection, so it is not practical. Currently, the number of leukocytes is estimated under the microscope for which morning urine is taken. It has been arbitrarily assumed that a number of over 4-5 leukocytes in the field of vision of the microscope indicates leukocyturia.

At the moment, there are also quick test strips available, allowing after wetting a special diagnostic bar, the detection of granulocytes in the urine, as evidenced by the color change of the test strip. The principle of their operation is based on the detection of granulocytes esterases, including leukocytes. This method, however, is burdened with a large number of false positive results (use of antibiotics, such as imipenem, meropenem, clavulanic acid, which is sometimes combined with penicillin derivatives) or false negative (gentamicin, cefalexin, glycosuria, proteinuria).

Leukocyturia is a laboratory symptom of many diseases like glomerulonephritis or pyelonephritis. It may occur in the case of diseases of the urinary tract, reproductive system and diseases of the abdominal organs. Leukocyturia is mostly a sign of urinary tract infection, especially if significant bacteriuria is found (for most people, the number of bacteria in a culture is > 10^5) and other symptoms associated with passing urine. The presence of leukocyturia does not indicate the need for antimicrobial therapy yet.

== Additional images ==
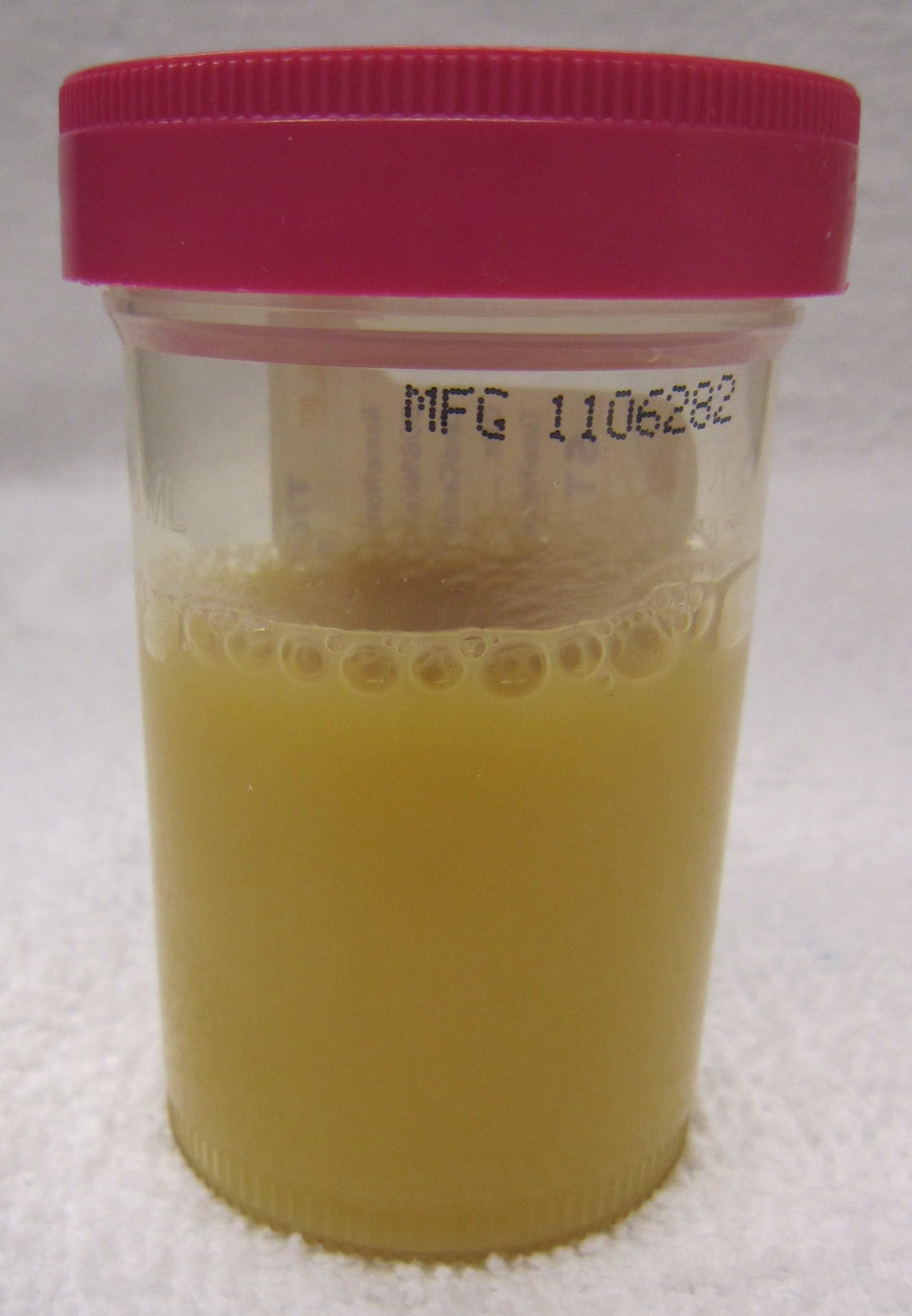
Pyuria in a person with urosepsis

== See also ==
- Urinalysis
- Bacteriuria
