= Ketonuria =

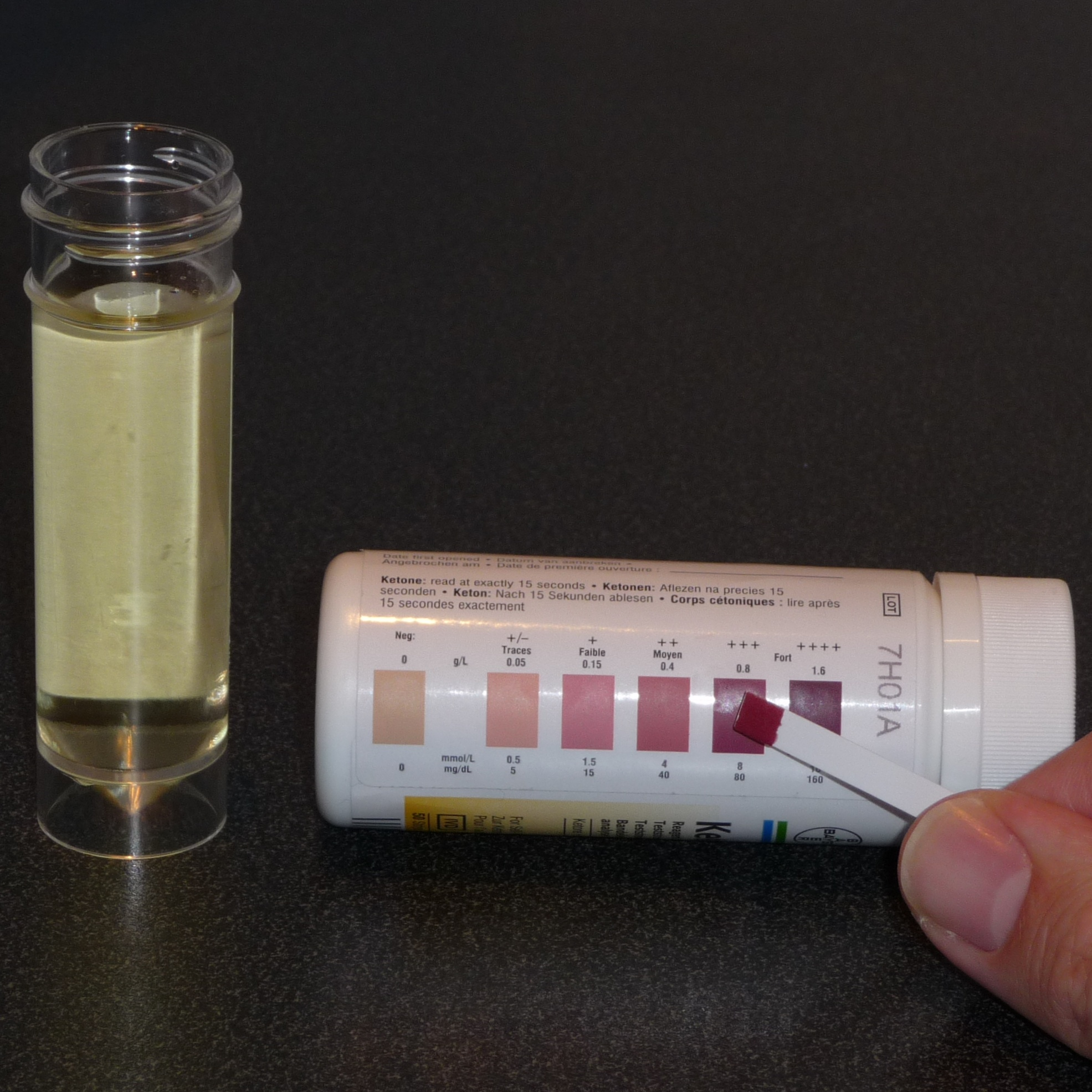
- Ketonuria using Bayer Ketostix
- Specialty: Endocrinology

Ketonuria is a medical condition in which ketone bodies are present in the urine.

It is seen in conditions in which the body produces excess ketones as an indication that it is using an alternative source of energy. It is seen during starvation or more commonly in type 1 diabetes mellitus. Production of ketone bodies is a normal response to a shortage of glucose, meant to provide an alternate source of fuel from fatty acids.

== Pathophysiology ==
Ketones are metabolic end-products of fatty acid metabolism. In healthy individuals, ketones are formed in the liver and are completely metabolized so that only negligible amounts appear in the urine. However, when carbohydrates are unavailable or unable to be used as an energy source, fat becomes the predominant body fuel instead of carbohydrates and excessive amounts of ketones are formed as a metabolic byproduct. Higher levels of ketones in the urine indicate that the body is using fat as the major source of energy.

Ketone bodies that commonly appear in the urine when fats are burned for energy are acetoacetate and beta-hydroxybutyric acid. Acetone is also produced and is expired by the lungs. Normally, the urine should not contain a noticeable concentration of ketones to give a positive reading. As with tests for glucose, acetoacetate can be tested by a dipstick or by a lab. The results are reported as small, moderate, or large amounts of acetoacetate. A small amount of acetoacetate is a value under 20 mg/dL; a moderate amount is a value of 30–40 mg/dL, and a finding of 80 mg/dL or greater is reported as a large amount.

One 2010 study admits that though ketonuria's relation to general metabolic health is ill-understood, there is a positive relationship between the presence of ketonuria after fasting and positive metabolic health.

== Causes ==
- Metabolic abnormalities such as diabetes, renal glycosuria, or glycogen storage disease.
- Dietary conditions such as starvation, fasting, low-carbohydrate diets, prolonged vomiting, and anorexia including caused by hyperemesis gravidarum.
- Conditions in which metabolism is increased, such as hyperthyroidism, fever, pregnancy or lactation.

In non-diabetic persons, ketonuria may occur during acute illness or severe stress. Approximately 15% of hospitalized patients may have ketonuria, even though they do not have diabetes. In a diabetic patient, ketone bodies in the urine suggest that the patient is not adequately controlled and that adjustments of medication, diet, or both should be made promptly. In the non diabetic patient, ketonuria reflects a reduced carbohydrate metabolism and an increased fat metabolism.

== Diagnosis ==
A wide variety of companies manufacture ketone screening strips. A strip consists of a thin piece of plastic film slightly larger than a matchstick, with a reagent pad on one end that is either dipped into a urine sample or passed through the stream while the user is voiding. The pad is allowed to react for an exact, specified amount of time (it is recommended to use a stopwatch to time this exactly and disregard any resultant colour change after the specified time); its resulting colour is then compared to a graded shade chart indicating a detection range from negative presence of ketones up to a significant quantity. In severe diabetic ketoacidosis, the dipstix reaction based on sodium nitroprusside may underestimate the level of ketone bodies in the blood. It is sensitive to acetoacetate only, and the ratio of beta-hydroxybutyric to acetoacetate is shifted from a normal value of around 1:1 up to around 10:1 under severely ketoacetotic conditions, due to a changing redox milieu in the liver. Measuring acetoacetate alone will thus underestimate the accompanying beta-hydroxybutyrate if the standard conversion factor is applied.

Urine value	Designation	Approximate serum concentration	
Urine value	Designation	mg/dL	mmol/L
0	Negative	Reference range: 0.5-3.0	0.05-0.29
1+		5 (interquartile range (IQR): 1–9)	0.5 (IQR: 0.1–0.9)
2+	Ketonuria	7 (IQR: 2–19)	0.7 (IQR: 0.2–1.8)
3+		30 (IQR: 14–54)	3 (IQR: 1.4–5.2)
4+	Severe ketonuria	-	-

=== Screening ===
Screening for ketonuria is done frequently for acutely ill patients, presurgical patients, and pregnant women. Any diabetic patient who has elevated levels of blood and urine glucose should be tested for urinary ketones. In addition, when diabetic treatment is being switched from insulin to oral hypoglycemic agents, the patient's urine should be monitored for ketonuria. The development of ketonuria within 24 hours after insulin withdrawal usually indicates a poor response to the oral hypoglycemic agents. Diabetic patients should have their urine tested regularly for glucose and ketones, particularly when acute infection or other illness develops.

In conditions associated with acidosis, urinary ketones are tested to assess the severity of acidosis and to monitor treatment response. Urine ketones appear before there is any significant increase in blood ketones; therefore, urine ketone measurement is especially helpful in emergency situations.
