= Renal glycosuria =

- Other names: Benign glycosuria, familial renal glycosuria, nondiabetic glycosuria, primary renal glycosuria, diabetes renalis, renal diabetes, diabetes innocence, low renal threshold, renal glucosuria
- Glucose
- Specialty: Medical genetics

Renal glycosuria is a rare condition in which the simple sugar glucose is excreted in the urine despite normal or low blood glucose levels. With normal kidney (renal) function, glucose is excreted in the urine only when there are abnormally elevated levels of glucose in the blood. However, in those with renal glycosuria, glucose is abnormally elevated in the urine due to improper functioning of the renal tubules, which are primary components of nephrons, the filtering units of the kidneys.

== Signs and symptoms ==
In most affected individuals, the condition causes no apparent symptoms (asymptomatic) or serious effects. When renal glycosuria occurs as an isolated finding with otherwise normal kidney function, the condition is thought to be inherited as an autosomal recessive trait.

== Causes ==
Renal glycosuria can result from Fanconi syndrome (with impaired absorption of phosphate, amino acids) or familial renal glucosuria (presents as isolated glucosuria). Familial renal glycosuria (FRG) is caused by mutations of SLC5A2, which codes for the sodium-glucose cotransporter 2.

Additionally, SGLT2 inhibitor medications produce glycosuria as their primary mechanism of action, by inhibiting sodium/glucose cotransporter 2 in the kidneys and thereby interfering with renal glucose reabsorption.

== Diagnosis ==
A doctor normally can diagnose renal glycosuria when a routine urine test (Urinalysis) detects glucose in the urine, while a blood test indicates that the blood glucose level is normal.

== Treatment ==
The cause of glycosuria determines whether the condition is chronic or acute. However, the presence of glucose in urine is not necessarily a serious or life-threatening condition. Managing diabetes, hyperthyroidism and regular kidney function tests can help in reducing excretion of sugars in urine.

== See also ==
- Sodium-glucose transport proteins
