= Suprapubic aspiration =

- Purpose: collection of urine for diagnostic testing

Suprapubic aspiration is a medical procedure used to collect a urine sample. It involves putting a needle through the skin just above the pubic bone into the urinary bladder. It is typically used as a method to collect urine for urine culture in patients less than 2 years of age but has also been used in elderly patients with success.

== Indications ==
In infants or young children with fever, laboratory analysis of the child's urine is needed to diagnose urinary tract infection. Children often are asymptomatic other than fever, or cannot describe the typical symptoms of pain or burning with urination. In children that cannot urinate on command, transurethral bladder catheterization is most often used. However, this method has high rates of sample contamination. Suprapubic aspiration has the lowest rates of contamination, but is often viewed as too invasive by practitioners and parents. In some children, urethral catheterization is not appropriate. In uncircumcised boys with tight phimosis or girls with labial adhesions or edema, suprapubic aspiration is safe, fast, and likely to yield an uncontaminated urine specimen.

Since suprapubic aspiration is more invasive than transurethral catheterization, some medical professionals use suprapubic aspiration after a urine sample obtained with transurethral catheterization shows bacterial growth and there is concern for contamination.

== Contraindications ==
Contraindications to suprapubic aspiration include:

- Abdominal distension
- Abdominal wall skin trauma or scarring
- Coagulopathy
  - Bleeding disorders such as thrombocytopenia or hemophilia
  - Elevated international normalized ratio
- Evidence of intervening bowel or intestines
- Major abnormalities of the genitourinary tract
- Nonpalpable bladder or the patient has urinated within 1 hour before the procedure
- Patients with bladder cancer
- Organomegaly or other intraabdominal organ abnormalities
- Overlying soft tissue infections of the abdominal wall
- Uncooperative patient
- Severe ascites or morbid obesity.

== Procedure ==
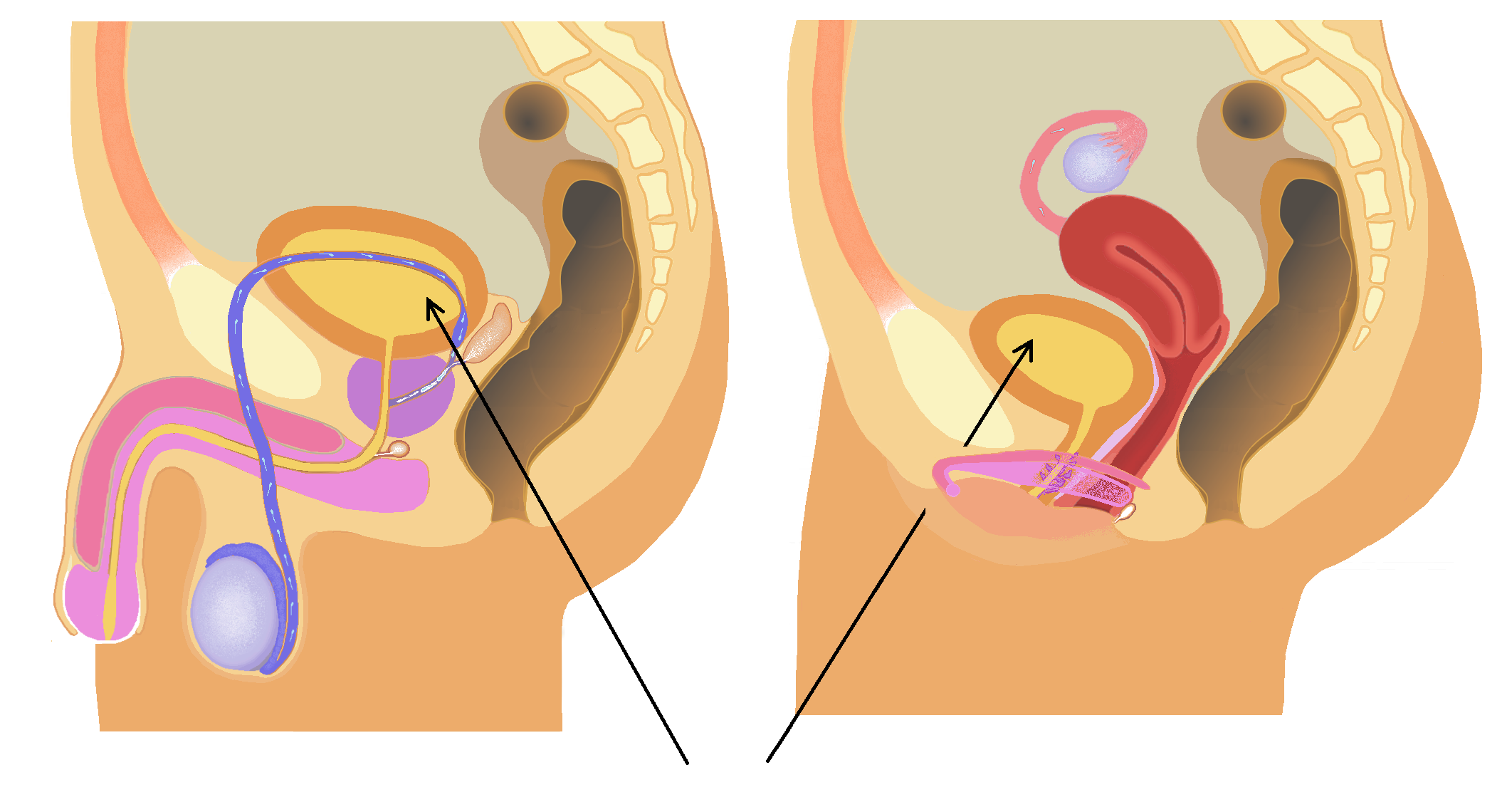
Male and female bladders, as indicated with arrows. Pathway of suprapubic aspiration is from the anterior abdominal wall (at left of each panel), just above the pubic symphysis. Note that a distended bladder will extend higher into the abdominal wall than the above image shows.

Suprapubic aspiration is best performed if the child has not urinated recently, and thus has a full bladder. In infants, this can be ensured by checking that their diaper is dry. In all cases, the bladder volume can be measured with ultrasound. In hospitals or clinics without access to ultrasound, the bladder can be palpated to verify location and estimate volume.

The area about 1-2 centimeters above the pubic symphysis is cleansed with antiseptic solution, such as betadine or alcohol. Local anesthesia of the planned puncture site can be given either as subcutaneous injection or topical cream.

The patient is held still with gentle restraint. Since some patients will involuntarily urinate when the needle enters the bladder, the urethra is occluded, either by gently squeezing the penis in boys, or by applying pressure on the urinary meatus in girls. A thin needle (similar in gauge to one used for routine blood draws) with a syringe is advanced until urine is withdrawn. Once adequate urine is collected, the needle is removed and any mild bleeding at the puncture site is stopped with gentle pressure.

The urine sample is then sent to the laboratory for urinalysis and urine culture.

== Complications ==
In children with full bladders verified by ultrasound, complications are rare. Small amounts of blood in the urine after the procedure is common and resolves quickly.

Large amounts of blood in the urine or infection of the abdominal wall puncture site are rare. Puncture of the bowel with the needle can occur if a loop of intestine overlays the bladder, but peritonitis is rare with such a small puncture and the injury usually not clinically significant. This can be avoided with use of ultrasound.

== See also ==
- Clinical Urine Tests
- Urinary catheterization
- Urinary tract infection
