= Hemolytic jaundice =

Type of jaundice

Hemolytic jaundice, also known as prehepatic jaundice, is a type of jaundice arising from hemolysis or excessive destruction of red blood cells, when the byproduct bilirubin is not excreted by the hepatic cells quickly enough. Unless the patient is concurrently affected by hepatic dysfunctions or is experiencing hepatocellular damage, the liver does not contribute to this type of jaundice.

As one of the three categories of jaundice, the most obvious sign of hemolytic jaundice is the discolouration or yellowing of the sclera and the skin of the patient, but additional symptoms may be observed depending on the underlying causes of hemolysis. Hemolytic causes associated with bilirubin overproduction are diverse and include disorders such as sickle cell anemia, hereditary spherocytosis, thrombotic thrombocytopenic purpura, autoimmune hemolytic anemia, hemolysis secondary to drug toxicity, thalassemia minor, and congenital dyserythropoietic anemias. Pathophysiology of hemolytic jaundice directly involves the metabolism of bilirubin, where overproduction of bilirubin due to hemolysis exceeds the liver's ability to conjugate bilirubin to glucuronic acid.

Diagnosis of hemolytic jaundice is based mainly on visual assessment of the yellowing of the patient's skin and sclera, while the cause of hemolysis must be determined using laboratory tests. Treatment of the condition is specific to the cause of hemolysis, but intense phototherapy and exchange transfusion can be used to help the patient excrete accumulated bilirubin. Complications related to hemolytic jaundice include hyperbilirubinemia and chronic bilirubin encephalopathy, which may be deadly without proper treatment.

== Signs and symptoms ==
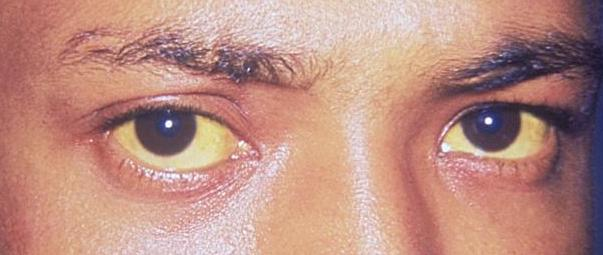
Yellowing of the sclera due to jaundice.

The signs and symptoms additional to the development of a yellowish colour in the sclera and skin are specific to the causes of hemolysis.

For example, if the patient has hemolytic jaundice resulting from sickle cell disease, vaso-occlusive phenomena like acute vaso-occlusive pain and acute chest syndrome may be observed in the acute phases, while in anemia, neurologic deficits and various pulmonary conditions may manifest in the chronic phase.

Regardless of the causes, laboratory-confirmed elevation is predominantly seen in unconjugated bilirubin. Serum bilirubin concentration rarely exceeds 4 mg/dL, unless the patient has concurrent liver disease.

== Causes ==
The underlying causes of hemolytic jaundice, as its name suggests, are disorders associated with hemolysis. Such disorders are manifold and the common causes include:

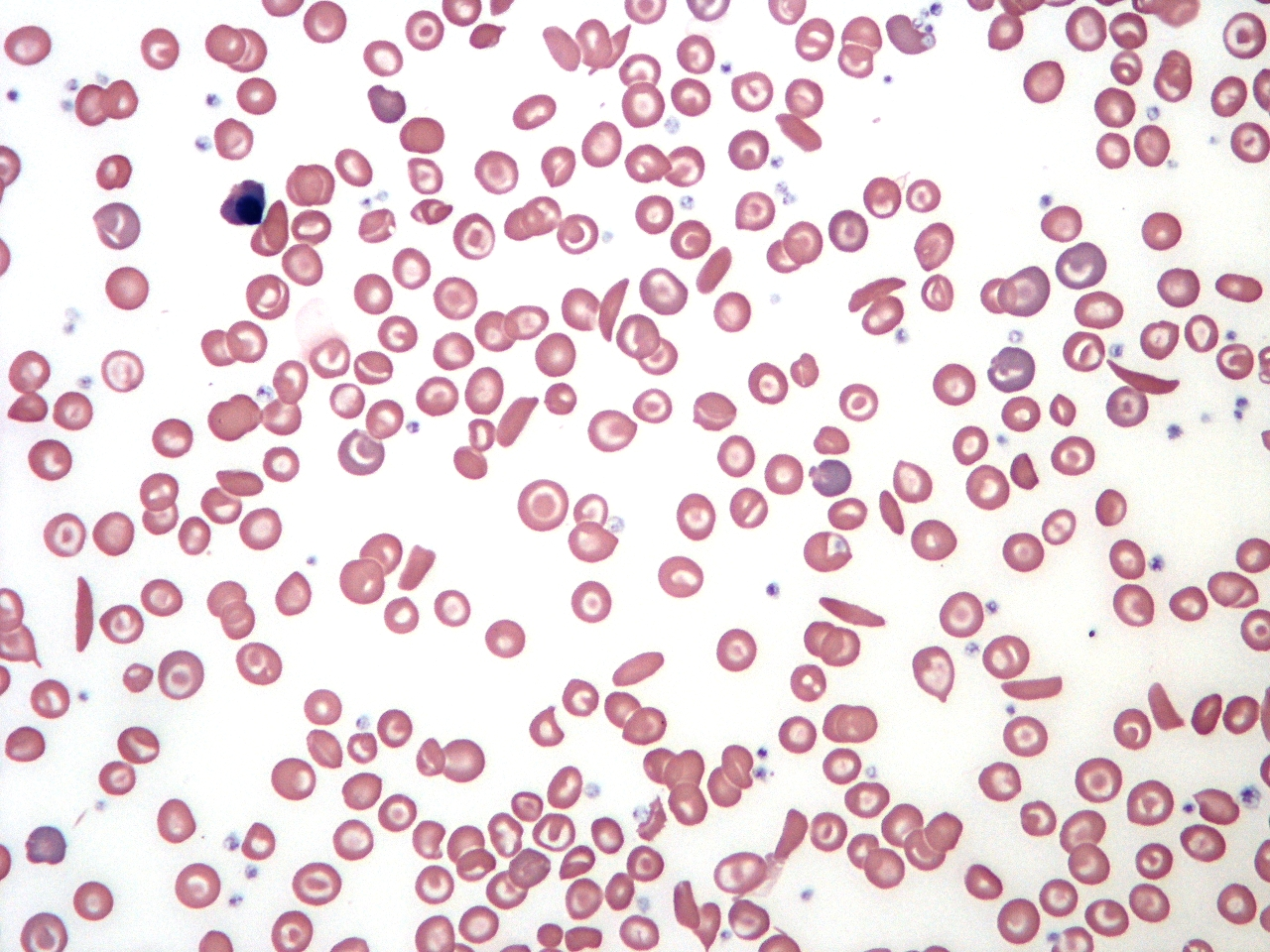
- Blood smear of a patient with sickle cell disease. The characteristic sickle-shaped appearance of red blood cells can be observed.
  Sickle cell disease, in which a mutation in the globin gene causes the formation of sickle hemoglobin. This disease is marked by the manifestation of chronic compensated hemolytic anemia, with laboratory findings not limited to unconjugated hyperbilirubinemia but also elevated serum lactate dehydrogenase and low serum haptoglobin.
- Thrombotic thrombocytopenic purpura, in which the reduced activity of the von Willebrand factor-cleaving protease ADAMTS13 causes a thrombotic microangiopathy. This disease, acquired or hereditary, is marked by very severe microangiopathic hemolytic anemia, with laboratory findings including extremely high serum lactate dehydrogenase and negative anti-RBC antibodies and Coombs test. Clinically, dark urine from hemoglobinuria may be observed because the hemolysis is intravascular (see Pathophysiology below).
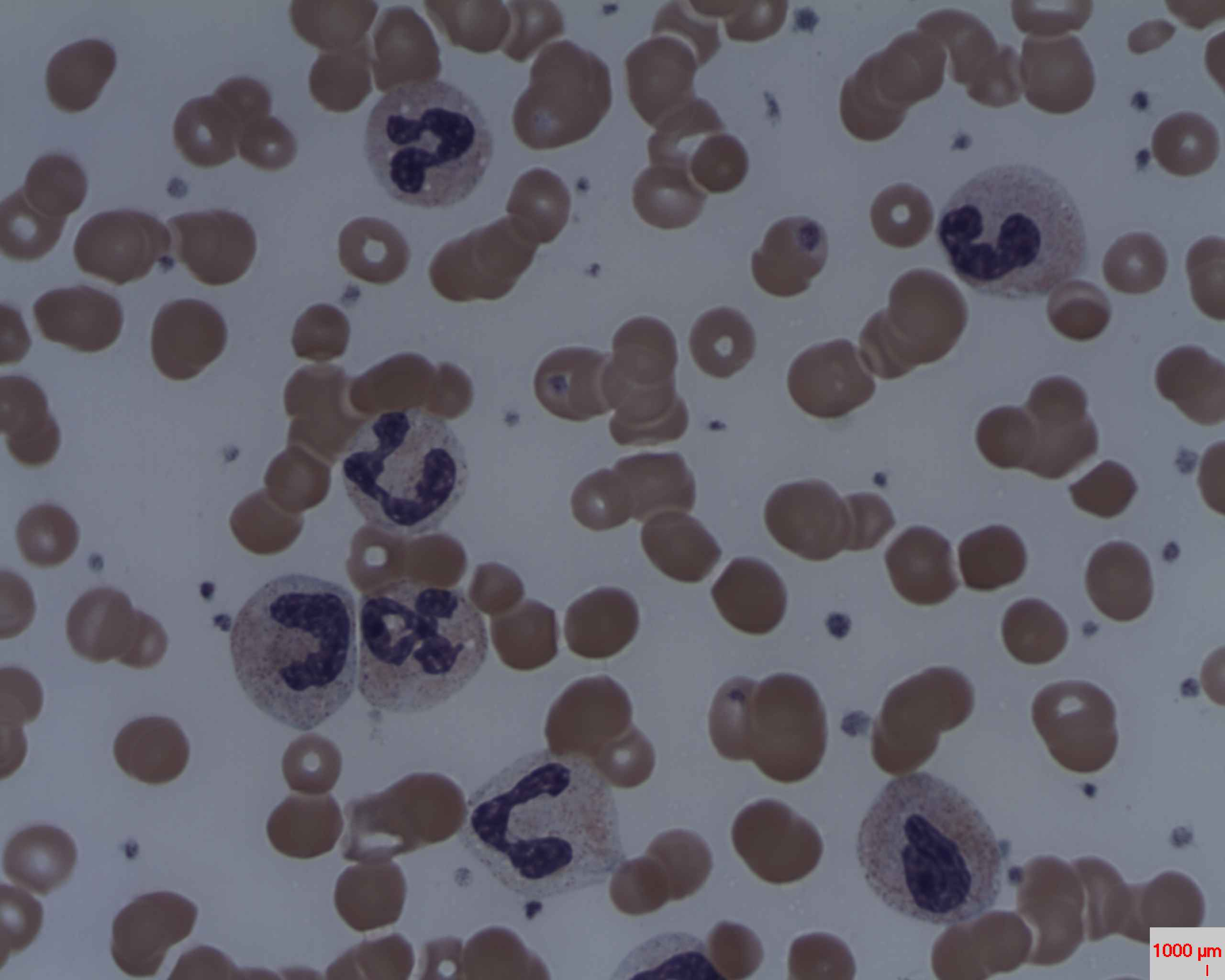
  Blood smear of a patient with Thrombotic Thrombocytopenic Purpura (TTP). Notice that some red blood cells are nucleated. This is a characteristic finding in such blood smears.
- Autoimmune hemolytic anemia (AIHA), in which autoantibodies react with self red blood cells and cause their destruction. This disease is marked by increased extravascular hemolysis, with laboratory findings including increased lactate dehydrogenase and decreased or absent haptoglobin in both warm and cold AIHA, and positive Coombs test. Clinically, jaundice or dark urine present in approximately one-third of the cases, and most of the symptoms are related to anemia.

Other less commonly observed causes of hemolysis include:

- Hemolysis secondary to drug toxicity
- Thalassemia minor
- Congenital dyserythropoietic anemia

The above list is not exhaustive, and rare causes of hemolysis such as Bartonella infection, hemolysis due to transfusion reactions, and microangiopathic hemolytic anemia should be suspected when symptoms specific to those causes manifest.

== Pathophysiology ==
=== Bilirubin overproduction ===
The mechanisms by which bilirubin is overproduced in hemolytic jaundice can be understood in relation to the two major sites of hemolysis: intravascular and extravascular.

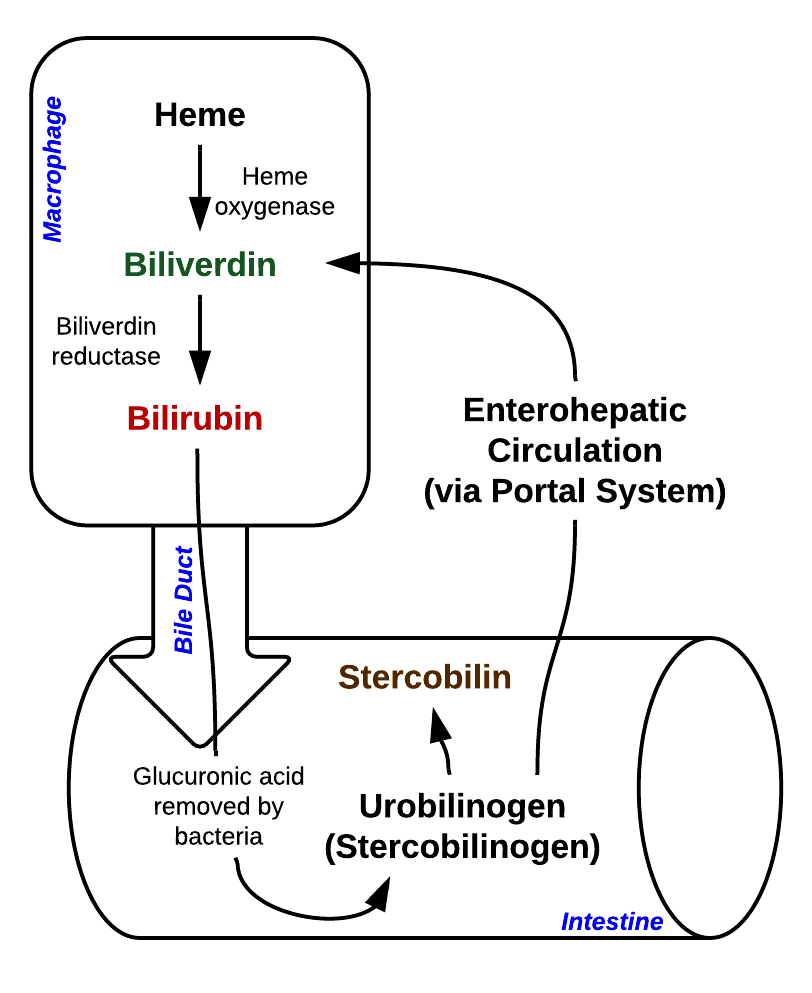
Process of heme breakdown that leads to the production of bilirubin, in extravascular hemolysis.

During intravascular hemolysis, red blood cells are broken down within the vasculature, allowing hemoglobin from the ruptured red blood cells to form haptoglobin-hemoglobin complexes with haptoglobin, which will be internalized and degraded by hepatocytes and the spleen. If the degree of hemolysis is abnormally high, the unbound hemoglobin is converted to methemoglobin from which the heme moiety is bound to hemopexin or to albumin, and both heme-hemopexin and heme-bound albumin are internalized by hepatocytes and subsequently degraded to bilirubin.

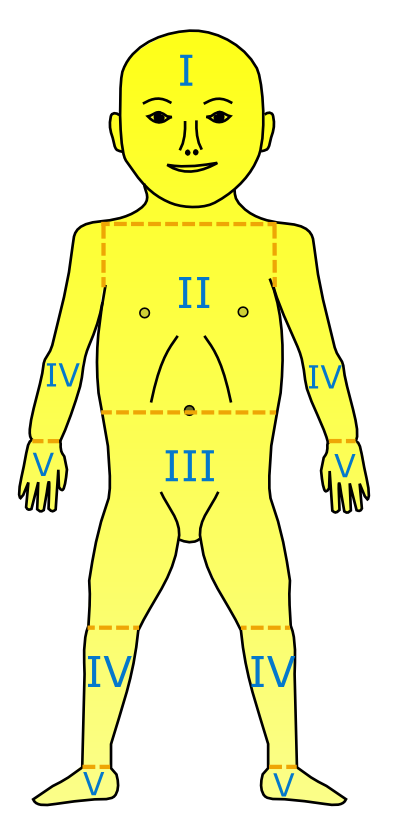
Zones of cephalocaudal jaundice progression according to the Kramer's scale.

During extravascular hemolysis, red blood cells are destroyed by phagocytosis by macrophages in the reticuloendothelial system and digested by phagosomes. Hemoglobin within red blood cells are then degraded to release heme, which will be converted by microsomal heme oxygenase to iron, carbon monoxide and biliverdin, and are immediately reduced to unconjugated bilirubin by biliverdin reductase and released into the plasma.

=== Affinity of unconjugated bilirubin to albumin ===
In both settings of hemolysis mentioned above, only low levels of conjugated bilirubin may accumulate in the serum, with the amount falling within the normal limits of 4 percent of total bilirubin as conjugated bilirubin can be efficiently excreted in bile through being secreted across canalicular membrane. Increased levels of conjugated bilirubin will only be observed with coexisting hepatobiliary abnormalities. Only when the canalicular excretion capacity is exceeded, conjugated bilirubin will accumulate in the plasma. As unconjugated bilirubin has a high affinity to albumin, at high level it is not efficiently cleared through glomerular filtration and it binds to the elastic tissue of the skin and sclera, where high albumin content can be found. This explains the yellow discolouration observed in these tissues in hemolytic jaundice.

== Diagnosis ==
Symptoms of jaundice can be observed superficially, thus visual methods are used to identify the condition. However, underlying causes of jaundice must be diagnosed through laboratory testing.

=== Visual assessment ===
In both newborns and adults, yellowing of the skin is a marker for jaundice. As most cases of jaundice are observed in newborns, healthcare workers use visual methods to identify the presence of this condition. A clinical jaundice scale, an adapted version of the Kramer's scale, is used to quantify the severity of jaundice through the spread of skin discoloration from zone 1, the head, to zone 5, the palms and soles of the neonate's body. Cephalocaudal progression of jaundice to zone 4 and 5 of the Kramer's scale shows a significant positive correlation with serum bilirubin concentration of at least 11.0 mg per 100 ml, indicating the need for treatment.

=== Jaundice Eye Colour Index (JECI) ===
Conjunctival icterus can be quantified by the Jaundice Eye Colour Index (JECI) through digital photography of the sclera, where a JECI of 0 indicates a white colour, and a JECI of 0.1 indicates an intense yellow colour, which is a sign of hemolytic jaundice.

=== Screening laboratory tests ===
Multiple tests can be used to diagnose jaundice, but results of different parameters must be compared to determine its etiology.

Laboratory tests for hemolytic jaundice
Method	Parameter	Results
Urinalysis	Urobilinogen	Increased
Urinalysis	Bilirubin	Absent
Urinalysis	Colour of urine	Normal
Stool analysis	Colour of faeces	Darker than normal
Complete blood count	Hemoglobin	Decreased
Complete blood count	Schistocytes	Present
Complete blood count	Reticulocytes	Increased
Serum testing	Total serum bilirubin	Increased
Serum testing	Conjugated bilirubin	Normal
Serum testing	Unconjugated bilirubin	Increased
Liver enzymes	Alkaline phosphatase	Normal
Liver enzymes	Aspartate transaminase (AST)	Normal
Liver enzymes	Alanine transaminase (ALT)	Normal

When a patient shows signs of jaundice such as the yellowing of the skin and sclera, a urine test is performed to check the levels of urobilinogen present. The presence of urobilinogen and its increased levels indicate that there are more than normal amounts of bilirubin in the intestine, showing that jaundice observed is not due to the blockage of bile flow, and is of pre-hepatic or hepatic causes. Normal colour of the patient's urine indicates the absence of unconjugated bilirubin.

Results from the urine test should be confirmed by a complete blood count (CBC) and serum testing for total serum bilirubin and fractionated bilirubin. Increased reticulocytes and the presence of schistocytes in the blood smear of the patient observed during CBC indicates hemolysis. If the patient has hemolytic jaundice, serum testing will show that conjugated bilirubin will only account for less than 15% of the total serum bilirubin due to the increase of unconjugated bilirubin.

Analysis of liver biopsies will show the levels of alkaline phosphatase, aspartate transaminase, and alanine transaminase in the patient, which has a negative correlation with liver function. Normal levels of these enzymes indicate that there is no significant hepatocellular damage.

When an infant is suspected to have hemolytic jaundice, abnormal morphologies of erythrocytes can be analyzed to find out the causes of hemolysis. A Coomb's test should be performed, and end-tidal carbon monoxide concentration should be monitored to understand the rate of hemolysis in the infant's body. If chronic hemolytic jaundice is diagnosed in a newborn, development of anemia and bilirubin cholelithiasis should be monitored as well.

=== Haptoglobin testing ===
If other symptoms of anemia is present, the amount of serum haptoglobin in the patient can be measured to test for hemolysis. During hemolysis, hemoglobin in blood dissociates and forms complexes with haptoglobins in the plasma, which are then catabolized. Low levels of haptoglobin resulting from the test shows that there are large amounts of free hemoglobin in the blood to be bound, acting as an indicator of hemolysis.

== Treatment ==
As jaundice is not common in adults, most treatment methods for this condition are centered around neonates, of which 50% develop jaundice.

=== Neonates ===
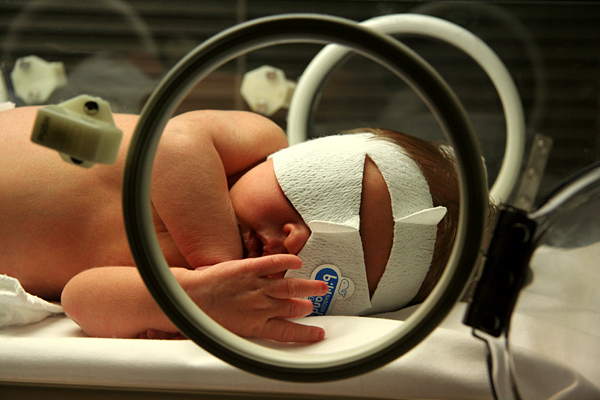
Phototherapy for newborns with jaundice.

Intensive phototherapy at saturation dose is used as a first-line clinical treatment which decreases the amount of accumulated unconjugated bilirubin in the infant's serum by the addition of oxygen, thus allowing it to dissolve in water so the liver can more easily convert it into products which can be excreted without further metabolism. For infants with hemolytic jaundice, severe and prolonged cases of hyperbilirubinemia, or high serum bilirubin that does not decrease after phototherapy, blood exchange transfusion is carried out at the umbilical venous catheter to mechanically remove bilirubin. In cases of immune hemolytic jaundice, intravenous immunoglobulin therapy may be used to treat the condition. Administration of intravenous immunoglobulin can block monocyte Fc-receptors, preventing or reducing further hemolysis.

=== Adults ===
In adults, hemolytic jaundice is uncommon, and medical treatment methods should be determined by recognizing the underlying causes of hemolysis in the patient.

== Complications ==
In cases where patients receive poor or no treatment of jaundice, neurodevelopmental complications may follow the condition, eventually leading to hearing loss, visual impairment, and in severe cases, mortality.

=== Hyperbilirubinemia ===
Hyperbilirubinemia may be observed when hemolysis produces too much bilirubin through the excessive breakdown of red blood cells, and the bilirubin builds up in the patient's blood and tissue fluids without proper excretion. Untreated or inadequately treated hyperbilirubinemia will lead to other complications such as kernicterus.

=== Kernicterus ===
Chronic bilirubin encephalopathy, also known as kernicterus, is a brain-damaging complication associated with both preterm and full term infants with jaundice, where the large amounts of unconjugated bilirubin in the infants become neurotoxic. Kernicterus affects mainly the basal ganglia, and its effects can spread to the hippocampus, geniculate nuclei, and cranial nerve nuclei. Symptoms of kernicterus include athetoid cerebral palsy and in severe cases, may lead to death of the patient. Most cases of kernicterus develop in infants following early hospital discharge from phototherapy.
