= Leukocyte esterase =

Test for white blood cells in urine

Leukocyte esterase is a type of esterase enzyme released by white blood cells (leukocytes), particularly neutrophils, when they are activated or recruited to a site of infection or inflammation. Although the exact structure and biological function remains unclear, leukocyte esterase represents a type of biomarker for leukocytes and thus can be utilized as a screening or diagnostic tool for various clinical pathologies.

== Structure and function ==
In a study using cytochemical methods and polyacrylamide gel electrophoresis, nine different esterase isozymes have been identified in human leukocytes with somewhat varying substrate specificities.

Esterase enzymes have the activity of hydrolyzing ester bonds in various substrates. In an electrochemical study using an ester substrate called 4-((tosyl-l-alanyl)oxy)phenyl tosyl-l-alaninate (TAPTA), direct esterolytic activity of leukocyte esterase could be demonstrated. Leukocyte esterase was found to hydrolyze TAPTA, releasing a redox-active fragment that provided a numerical measure of leukocyte esterase activity when oxidized at an electrode.

Studies on the direct immune function of leukocyte esterase activity, however, are unclear. Although leukocyte esterase is released by neutrophils in response to infection, there is limited research on its direct role in the degradation of pathogens or foreign substances during phagocytosis by neutrophils. Instead, leukocyte esterase serves more as an indicator of an immune response, as it reflects the presence of active white blood cells.

== Clinical applications ==
Leukocyte esterase can be detected in various bodily fluids such as urine, synovial fluid, cerebrospinal fluid and ascitic fluid, using reagent strips. The presence of leukocyte esterase is often correlated with the presence of active leukocytes, which can indicate infection or inflammation in those areas. The clinical applications of leukocyte esterase detection include:

=== Urinary tract infections ===
A urinary tract infection is a common infection that can affect both the upper and lower urinary tracts including the kidneys, ureters, bladder and urethra. Diagnosis is typically based on a combination of symptoms with urinalysis, which includes a urine dipstick and microscopic examination.

The presence of leukocyte esterase in urine suggests pyuria and serves as a valuable biomarker for screening for urinary tract infections, along with nitrites. A 2019 systemic review found that the combination of leukocyte esterase and nitrite dipstick tests demonstrated high sensitivity and low negative likelihood ratios, making them effective in excluding urinary tract infections.

=== Spontaneous bacterial peritonitis ===
Spontaneous bacterial peritonitis is a bacterial infection of ascitic fluid, commonly associated with cirrhosis. The gold standard for the diagnosis of spontaneous bacterial peritonitis is an ascitic fluid culture that shows a polymorphonuclear cell count of ≥250 cells/mm^{3}. However, leukocyte esterase reagent strips show promise as an inexpensive, rapid, non-invasive alternative for detecting the presence of PMNs to diagnose or screen for spontaneous bacterial peritonitis. A 2021 systematic review and meta-analysis found that leukocyte esterase reagent strips demonstrated good overall sensitivity and specificity for diagnosing spontaneous bacterial peritonitis, although there were some variations depending on the manufacturer.

"It has been proposed that the reagent strip for leukocyte esterase designed for the testing of urine (Combur test UX) could be a useful tool for diagnosing spontaneous bacterial peritonitis." Braga et al. concluded that the Combur test UX urine screening test is a very sensitive and specific method for diagnosing spontaneous bacterial peritonitis in the ascitic fluid of cirrhotic patients who have undergone paracentesis.

=== Peri-prosthetic joint infections ===
Leukocyte esterase strip tests also have value in testing for peri-prosthetic joint infections, a potentially devastating complication of joint replacement surgery that can be challenging to diagnose.

In a 2017 systemic review and meta-analysis study, the diagnostic value of leukocyte esterase testing in synovial fluid for peri-prosthetic joint infections was evaluated. The findings suggested that leukocyte esterase had high specificity in excluding peri-prosthetic joint infections. Subsequent 2019 and 2020 meta-analysis studies compared two biomarkers in synovial fluid—alpha-defensin and leukocyte esterase—to assess their ability to reliably diagnose peri-prosthetic joint infection. Diagnostic accuracy was measured in terms of sensitivity, specificity, negative predictive value and positive predictive value. The results indicated that both biomarkers demonstrated valuable diagnostic accuracy, with high sensitivity and high specificity. Both are excellent biomarkers for peri-prosthetic joint infections but LE strip testing has the advantage of being much less expensive than testing for alpha-defensin.

== See also ==
- Enzyme
- List of enzymes
- Ester
- Biomarker
- Alpha-defensin
