= Chyluria =

- Other names: Chylous urine
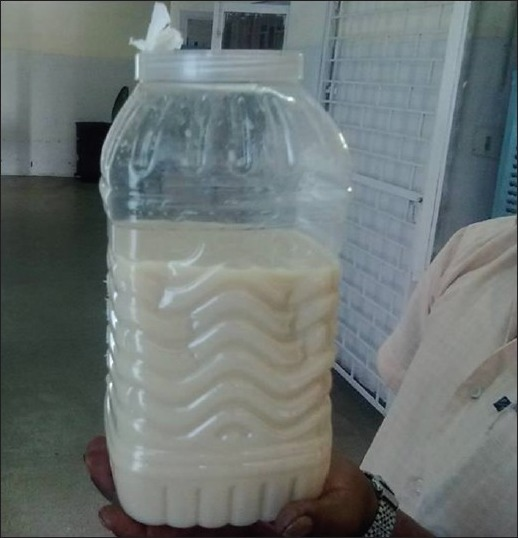
- Urine from a patient with filarial chyluria.
- Specialty: Infectious disease

Chyluria, also called chylous urine, is a medical condition involving the presence of chyle in the urine stream, which results in urine appearing milky white. The condition is usually classified as being either parasitic or non parasitic. It is a condition that is more prevalent among people of Africa and the Indian subcontinent.

Chyluria appearance is irregular and intermittent. It may last several days, weeks or even months. There are several factors that trigger Chyluria recurrence.

== Signs and symptoms ==
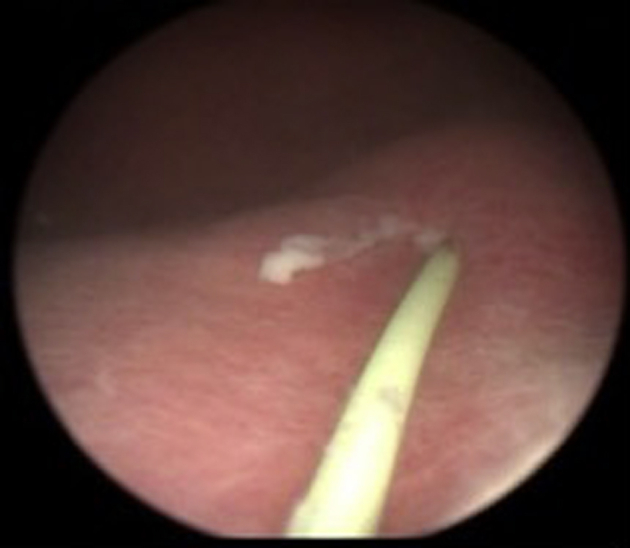
Chyluria flow during cystoscopy and ureteral catheterization.

Once the lymph channels are blocked, one may open into the kidney hilum or ureter or sometimes into the bladder and chyle can leak into the urinary tract resulting in milky white urine. Blood sometimes mixes with the urine resulting in haemato-chyluria.

Usually the condition is self-limiting and can sometimes lead to complications. Symptoms of chyluria can include dysuria (pain when urinating), hematuria (blood in urine), urinary tract infections; and, in more severe cases, weight loss, hypoproteinemia, and immunosuppression. If left untreated, chronic chyluria can lead to malnutrition and fat-soluble vitamin deficiency.

== Causes ==
Chyluria is often caused by filariasis due to the parasite Wuchereria bancrofti, a thready nematode which lodges the lymph channels. The parasitic infection can lead to obstruction of peripheral lymphatic vessels and increased pressure within the vessels causing collateral flow of the lymph, redirecting the lymph flow from the intestinal lymphatic vessels into the lymphatic vessels of the kidney and ureter. Because of obstruction, subsequent local inflammation of the area leads to dilation of the lymph vessels and the development of a urinary fistulae due to rupture of the lymphatic vessel, which allows for the passage of white blood cells, fat, and fat-soluble vitamins into the urine. Additionally, lymphatic malformations, blunt or penetrating trauma, surgery complications, non-parasitic infections, malignant tumors, and pregnancy are all possible non-parasitic causes of chyluria, with lymphatic channel malformations being the most common.

== Treatment ==
In order to diagnose this condition, urinalysis, triglyceride tests, ultrasonography, lymphangiography, and/or endoscopy may be performed to identify the presence of fats in the patient’s urine. Following a low fat and high fluid diet is recommend for managing symptoms.

Medicines that inhibit cholesterol absorption in the small intestine, such as Ezetimibe, may be effective treatments in some patients.

An anti-filarial drug, such as diethylcarbamazine, may be prescribed. Severe damage to lymph channels may require surgery. Sclerotherapy with instillation of 1% of silver nitrate or povidone iodine (2ml of 5% + 8ml distilled water).
