= Bacteriuria =

Presence of bacteria in urine

- Other names: Bacteruria
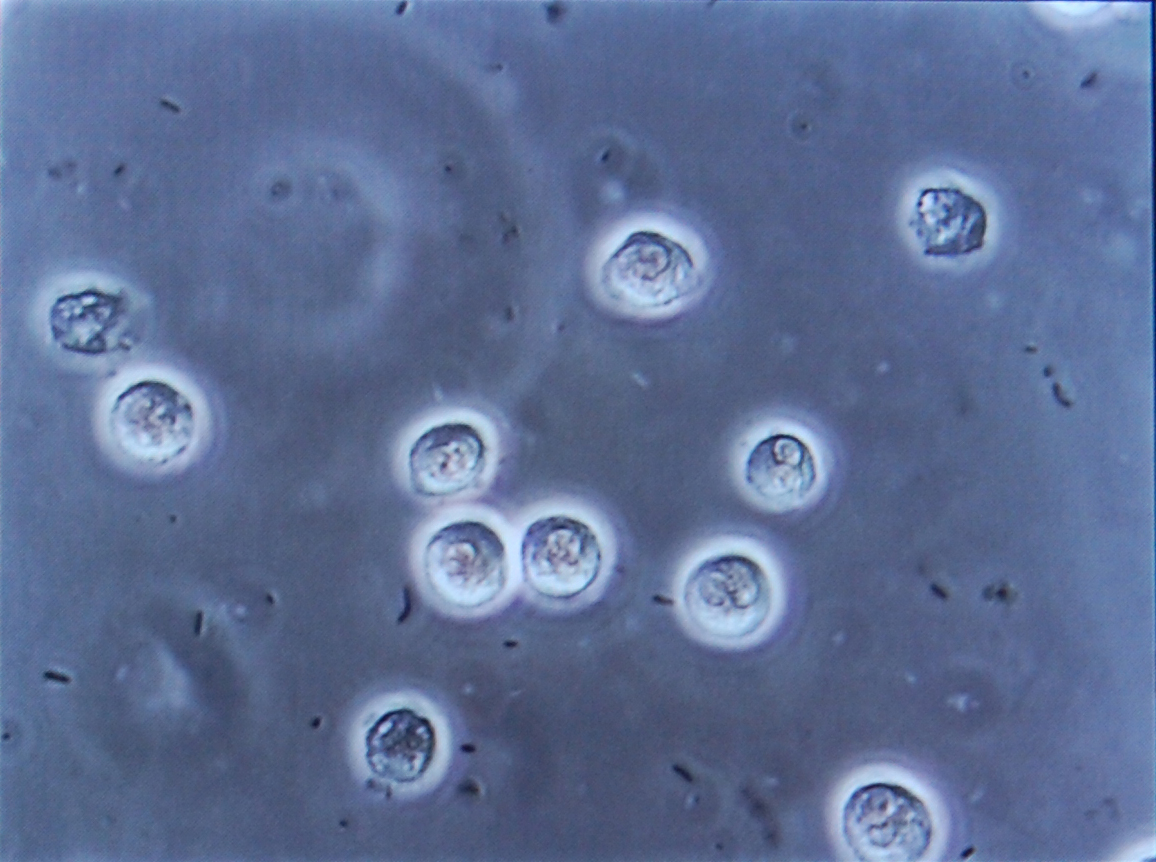
- Multiple rod-shaped bacteria shown between the larger white blood cells at urinary microscopy from a person with urinary tract infection.
- Specialty: Emergency medicine, infectious disease
- Types: Asymptomatic, symptomatic
- Diagnostic method: Urinalysis, urine culture
- Differential diagnosis: Contamination
- Treatment: Based on symptoms or risk factors
- Frequency: Asymptomatic: 3% (middle aged women), up to 50% (women in nursing homes); Symptomatic: up to 10% of women a year

Bacteriuria is the presence of bacteria in urine. Bacteriuria accompanied by symptoms is a urinary tract infection while that without is known as asymptomatic bacteriuria. Diagnosis is by urinalysis or urine culture. Escherichia coli is the most common bacterium found. People without symptoms should generally not be tested for the condition. Differential diagnosis include contamination.

If symptoms are present, treatment is generally with antibiotics. Bacteriuria without symptoms generally does not require treatment. Exceptions may include pregnant women, those who have had a recent kidney transplant, young children with significant vesicoureteral reflux, and those undergoing surgery of the urinary tract.

Bacteriuria without symptoms is present in about 3% of otherwise healthy middle aged women. In nursing homes rates are as high as 50% among women and 40% in men. In those with a long term indwelling urinary catheter rates are 100%. Up to 10% of women have a urinary tract infection in a given year and half of all women have at least one infection at some point in their lives. There is an increased risk of asymptomatic or symptomatic bacteriuria in pregnancy due to physiological changes that occur in a pregnant woman which promotes unwanted pathogen growth in the urinary tract.

== Signs and symptoms ==
=== Asymptomatic ===
Asymptomatic bacteriuria is bacteriuria without accompanying symptoms of a urinary tract infection and is commonly caused by the bacterium Escherichia coli. Other potential pathogens are Klebsiella spp., and group B streptococci. It is more common in women, in the elderly, in residents of long-term care facilities, and in people with diabetes, bladder catheters, and spinal cord injuries. People with a long-term Foley catheter always show bacteriuria. Chronic asymptomatic bacteriuria occurs in as many as 50% of the population in long-term care.

There is an association between asymptomatic bacteriuria in pregnant women with low birth weight, preterm delivery, cystitis, infection of the newborn and fetus death.However, most of these studies were graded as poor quality. Bacteriuria in pregnancy also increases the risk of preeclampsia.

=== Symptomatic ===
Symptomatic bacteriuria is bacteriuria with the accompanying symptoms of a urinary tract infection (such as frequent urination, painful urination, fever, back pain, abdominal pain and blood in the urine) and includes pyelonephritis or cystitis. The most common cause of urinary tract infections is Escherichia coli.

== Diagnosis ==
Testing for bacteriuria is usually performed in people with symptoms of a urinary tract infection. Certain populations that cannot feel or express symptoms of infection are also tested when showing nonspecific symptoms. For example, confusion or other changes in behaviour can be a sign of an infection in the elderly. Screening for asymptomatic bacteriuria in pregnancy is a common routine in many countries, but controversial.

- The gold standard for detecting bacteriuria is a bacterial culture which identifies the concentration of bacterial cells in the urine. The culture is usually combined with subsequent testing using biochemical methods or MALDI-TOF, which allows to identify the causal bacterial species, and antibiotic susceptibility testing. Urine culture is quantitative and very reliable, but can take at least one day to obtain a result and it is expensive. Miniaturization of bacterial culture within dipstick format, Digital Dipstick, allows bacterial detection, identification and quantification for bacteriuria within 10–12 hours at the point-of-care. Clinicians will often treat symptomatic bacteriuria based on the results of the urine dipstick test while waiting for the culture results.
- Bacteriuria can usually be detected using a urine dipstick test. The nitrite test detects nitrate-reducing bacteria if growing in high numbers in urine. A negative dipstick test does not exclude bacteriuria, as not all bacteria which can colonise the urinary tract are nitrate-reducing. The leukocyte esterase test indirectly detects the presence of leukocytes (white blood cells) in urine which can be associated with a urinary tract infection. In the elderly, the leukocyte esterase test is often positive even in the absence of an infection. The urine dipstick test is readily available and provides fast, but often unreliable results. Some organisms such as chlamydia and Ureaplasma urealyticum will produce a negative leukocyte esterase reaction.
- Microscopy can also be used to detect bacteriuria. It is rarely used in clinical routine since it requires more time and equipment and does not allow reliable identification or quantification of the causal bacterial species.

Bacteriuria is assumed if a single bacterial species is isolated in a concentration greater than 100,000 colony forming units per millilitre of urine in clean-catch midstream urine specimens. In urine samples obtained from women, there is a risk for bacterial contamination from the vaginal flora. Therefore, in research, usually a second specimen is analysed to confirm asymptomatic bacteriuria in women. For urine collected via bladder catheterization in men and women, a single urine specimen with greater than 100,000 colony forming units of a single species per millilitre is considered diagnostic. The threshold for women displaying UTI symptoms can be as low as 100 colony forming units of a single species per millilitre. However, bacteria below a threshold of 10000 colony forming units per millilitre are usually reported as "no growth" by clinical laboratories.

Using special techniques certain non-disease causing bacteria have also been found in the urine of healthy people. These are part of the resident microbiota.

=== Screening ===
Although controversial, many countries including the United States recommend a one time screening for bacteriuria during mid pregnancy. The screening method is by urine culture. Screening non-pregnant adults is recommended against by the United States Preventive Task Force.

== Treatment ==
The decision to treat bacteriuria depends on the presence of accompanying symptoms and comorbidities.

=== Asymptomatic ===
Asymptomatic bacteriuria generally does not require treatment. Exceptions include those undergoing surgery of the urinary tract, children with vesicoureteral reflux or others with structural abnormalities of the urinary tract. In many countries, regional guidelines recommend treatment of pregnant women.

There is no indication to treat asymptomatic bacteriuria in diabetics, renal transplant recipients, and in those with spinal cord injuries.

The overuse of antibiotics to treat asymptomatic bacteriuria has many adverse effects such as an increased risk of diarrhea, the spread of antimicrobial resistance, and infection due to Clostridioides difficile.

=== Symptomatic ===
Symptomatic bacteriuria is synonymous with urinary tract infection and typically treated with antibiotics. Common choices include nitrofurantoin and trimethoprim/sulfamethoxazole.

== Epidemiology ==
Rates of asymptomatic bacteriuria
Group		Prevalence (in %)
Healthy premenopausal women		1.0 to 5.0
Pregnant women		1.9 to 9.5
Postmenopausal women (50 to 70 years of age)		2.8 to 8.6
People with diabetes mellitus	Women	9.0 to 27.0
People with diabetes mellitus	Men	0.7 to 1.0
Older community-dwelling people	Women (older than 70 years)	> 15.0
Older community-dwelling people	Men	3.6 to 19.0
Older long-term care residents	Women	25.0 to 50.0
Older long-term care residents	Men	15.0 to 40.0
People with spinal cord injury	Intermittent catheter	23.0 to 89.0
People with spinal cord injury	Sphincterotomy and condom catheter	57.0
People undergoing hemodialysis		28.0
People with an indwelling urinary catheter	Short-term	9.0 to 23.0
People with an indwelling urinary catheter	Long-term	100
