= The Four Stages of Cruelty =

Series of printed engravings by William Hogarth

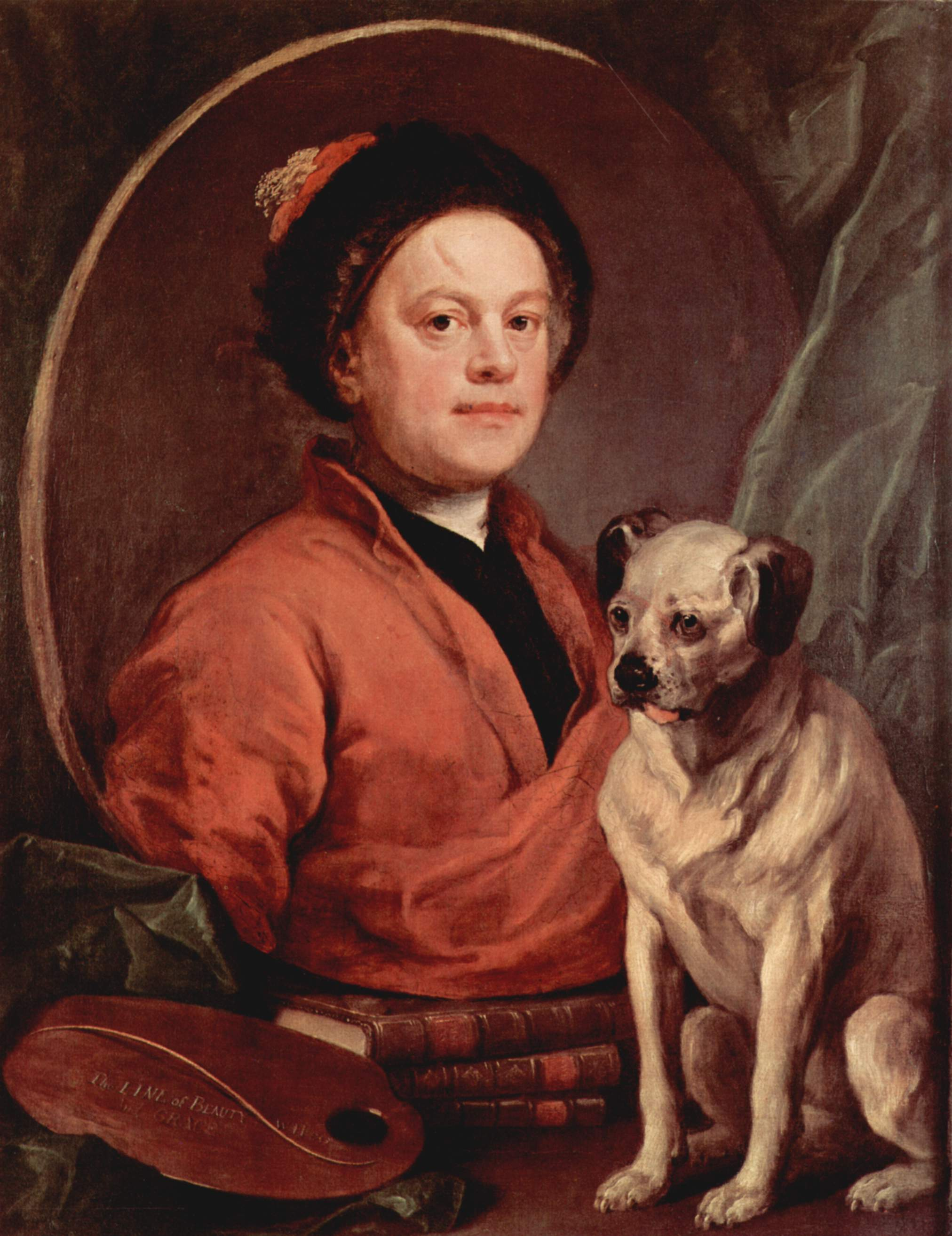
William Hogarth

The Four Stages of Cruelty is a series of four printed engravings published by English artist William Hogarth in 1751. Each print depicts a different stage in the life of the fictional Tom Nero.

Beginning with the torture of a dog as a child in the First stage of cruelty, Nero progresses to beating his horse as a man in the Second stage of cruelty, and then to robbery, seduction, and murder in Cruelty in perfection. Finally, in The reward of cruelty, he receives what Hogarth warns is the inevitable fate of those who start down the path Nero has followed: his body is taken from the gallows after his execution as a murderer and is mutilated by surgeons in the anatomical theatre.

The prints were intended as a form of moral instruction; Hogarth was dismayed by the routine acts of cruelty he witnessed on the streets of London. Issued on cheap paper, the prints were destined for the lower classes. The series shows a roughness of execution and a brutality that is untempered by the funny touches common in Hogarth's other works, but which he felt was necessary to impress his message on the intended audience. Nevertheless, the pictures still carry the wealth of detail and subtle references that are characteristic of Hogarth.

== History ==
In common with other prints by Hogarth, such as Beer Street and Gin Lane, The Four Stages of Cruelty was issued as a warning against immoral behaviour, showing the easy path from childish thug to convicted criminal. His aim was to correct "that barbarous treatment of animals, the very sight of which renders the streets of our metropolis so distressing to every feeling mind". Hogarth loved animals, picturing himself with his pug in a self-portrait, and marking the graves of his dogs and birds at his home in Chiswick.

Hogarth deliberately portrayed the subjects of the engravings with little subtlety since he meant the prints to be understood by "men of the lowest rank" when seen on the walls of workshops or taverns. The images themselves, as with Beer Street and Gin Lane, were roughly drawn, lacking the finer lines of some of his other works. Fine engraving and delicate artwork would have rendered the prints too expensive for the intended audience, and Hogarth also believed a bold stroke could portray the passions of the subjects just as well as fine lines, noting that "neither great correctness of drawing or fine engraving were at all necessary".

To ensure that the prints were priced within reach of the intended audience, Hogarth originally commissioned the block-cutter J. Bell to produce the four designs as woodcuts. This proved more expensive than expected, so only the last two of the four images were cut and were not issued commercially at the time. Instead, Hogarth proceeded to create the engravings himself and announced the publication of the prints, along with that of Beer Street and Gin Lane, in the London Evening Post over three days from 14 to 16 February 1751. The prints themselves were published on 21 February 1751 and each was accompanied by a moralising commentary, written by the Rev. James Townley, a friend of Hogarth's. As with earlier engravings, such as Industry and Idleness, individual prints were sold on "ordinary" paper for 1s. (one shilling, equating to about £ 9.80 in 2025 terms), cheap enough to be purchased by the lower classes as a means of moral instruction. "Fine" versions were also available on "superior" paper for 1s. 6d. (one shilling and sixpence, about £ 14.70 in 2025 terms) for collectors.

Variations on plates III and IV exist from Bell's original woodcuts, bearing the earlier date of 1 January 1750, and were reprinted in 1790 by John Boydell, but examples from either of the woodcut printings are uncommon.^{[a]}

== Prints ==
=== First stage of cruelty ===
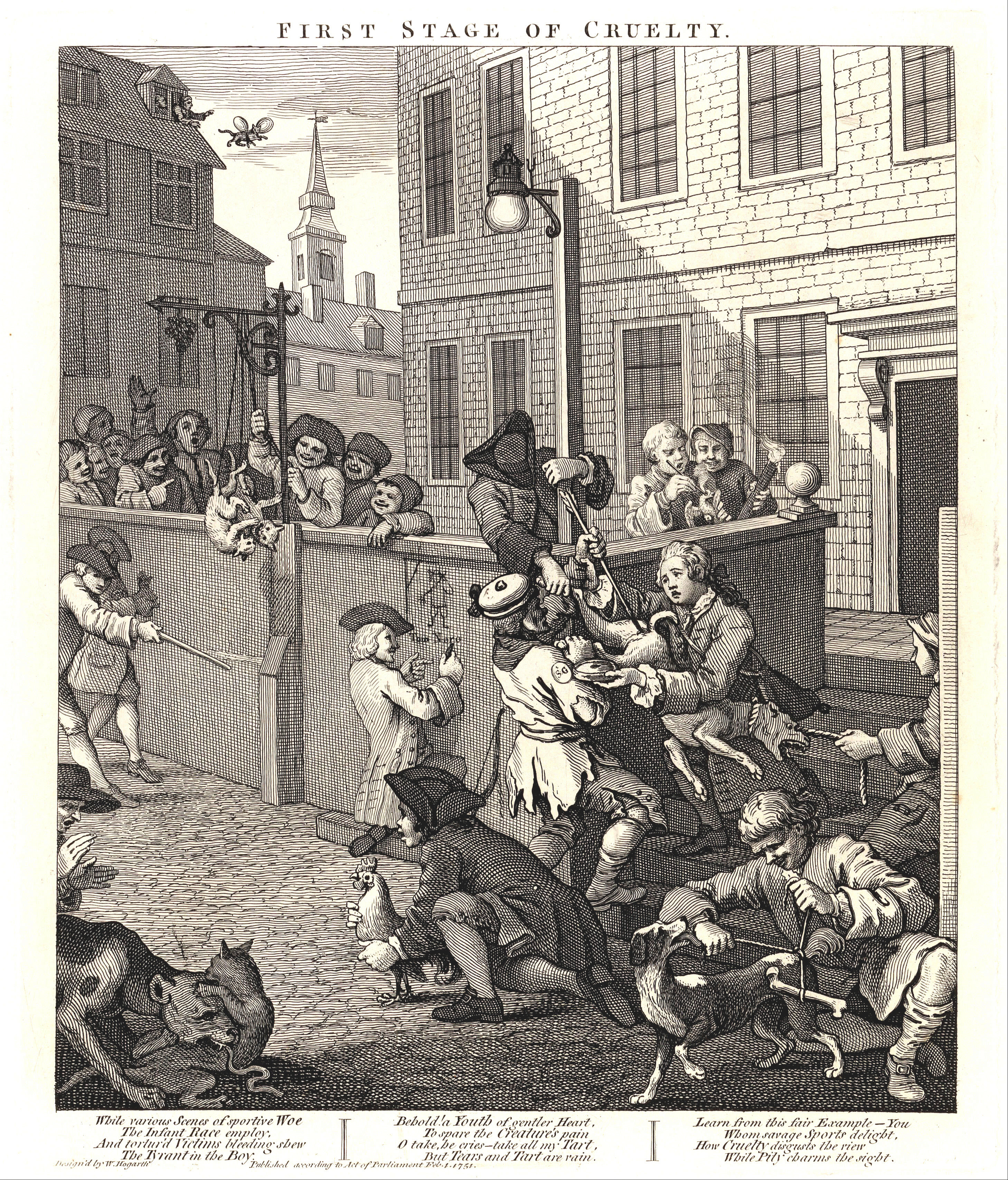
First stage of cruelty (Plate I)

In the first print Hogarth introduces Tom Nero, whose surname may have been inspired by the Roman Emperor of the same name or a contraction of "No hero". Conspicuous in the centre of the plate, he is shown being assisted by other boys to insert an arrow into a dog's rectum, a torture apparently inspired by a devil punishing a sinner in Jacques Callot's Temptation of St. Anthony. A badge initialled with "S:G", on the shoulder of his light-hued, ragged coat, shows him to be receiving welfare from the parish of St Giles, in accordance with the Poor Act 1697, which required all recipients of parish charity to wear a badge with the parish's initials on their right shoulder. Hogarth used this notorious slum area as the background for many of his works including Gin Lane and Noon, part of the Four Times of the Day series. A more tender-hearted boy, perhaps the dog's owner, pleads with Nero to stop tormenting the frightened animal, even offering food in an attempt to appease him. This boy supposedly represents the young George, Prince of Wales (later King George III), who was twelve years old in the year the cartoon was published. His appearance is deliberately more pleasing than the scowling ugly ruffians that populate the rest of the picture, made clear in the text at the bottom of the scene:

While various Scenes of sportive Woe,
The Infant Race employ,
And tortur'd Victims bleeding shew,
The Tyrant in the Boy.

Behold! a Youth of gentler Heart,
To spare the Creature's pain,
O take, he cries—take all my Tart,
But Tears and Tart are vain.

Learn from this fair Example—You
Whom savage Sports delight,
How Cruelty disgusts the view,
While Pity charms the sight.

The young "George III"

The other boys carry out equally barbaric acts: the two boys at the top of the steps are burning the eyes out of a bird with a hot needle heated by the link-boy's torch; the boys in the foreground are throwing at a cock (perhaps an allusion to a nationalistic enmity towards the French, and a suggestion that the action takes place on Shrove Tuesday, the traditional day for cock-shying); another boy ties a bone to a dog's tail—tempting, but out of reach; a pair of fighting cats are hung by their tails and taunted by a jeering group of boys; in the bottom left-hand corner a dog is set on a cat, with the latter's intestines spilling out onto the ground; and in the rear of the picture another cat tied to two bladders is thrown from a high window. In a foreshadowing of his ultimate fate, Tom Nero's name is written under the chalk drawing of a man hanging from the gallows; the meaning is made clear by the schoolboy artist pointing towards Tom. The absence of parish officers who should be controlling the boys is an intentional rebuke on Hogarth's part; he agreed with Henry Fielding that one of the causes for the rising crime rate was the lack of care from the overseers of the poor, who were too often interested in the posts only for the social status and monetary rewards they could bring.

Below the text the authorship is established: Designed by W. Hogarth, Published according to Act of Parliament. 1 Feb.. 1751 The Act of Parliament referred to is the Engraving Copyright Act 1734. Many of Hogarth's earlier works had been reproduced in great numbers without his authority or any payment of royalties, and he was keen to protect his artistic property, so had encouraged his friends in Parliament to pass a law to protect the rights of engravers. Hogarth had been so instrumental in pushing the Bill through Parliament that on passing it became known as the "Hogarth Act".

=== Second stage of cruelty ===
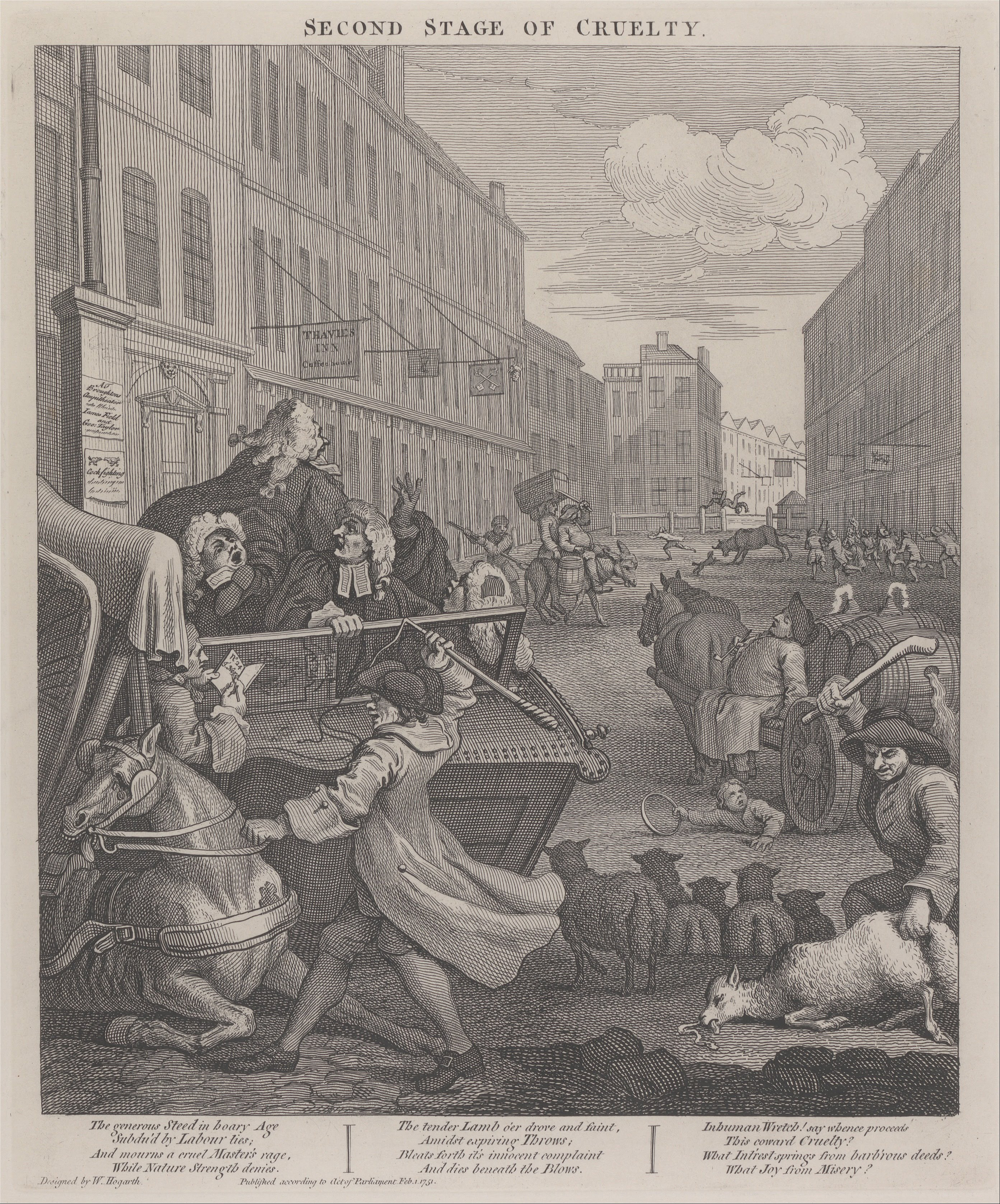
Second stage of cruelty (Plate II)

In the second plate, the scene is Thavies Inn Gate (sometimes ironically written as Thieves Inn Gate), one of the Inns of Chancery which housed associations of lawyers in London. Tom Nero has grown up and become a hackney coachman, and the recreational cruelty of the schoolboy has turned into the professional cruelty of a man at work. Tom's horse, worn out from years of mistreatment and overloading, has collapsed, breaking its leg and upsetting the carriage. Disregarding the animal's pain, Tom has beaten it so furiously that he has put its eye out. In a satirical aside, Hogarth shows four corpulent barristers struggling to climb out of the carriage in a ludicrous state. They are probably caricatures of eminent jurists, but Hogarth did not reveal the subjects' names, and they have not been identified. Elsewhere in the scene, other acts of cruelty against animals take place: a drover beats a lamb to death, an ass is driven on by force despite being overloaded, and an enraged bull tosses one of its tormentors. Some of these acts are recounted in the moral accompanying the print:

The generous Steed in hoary Age,
Subdu'd by Labour lies;
And mourns a cruel Master's rage,
While Nature Strength denies.

The tender Lamb o'er drove and faint,
Amidst expiring Throws;
Bleats forth it's innocent complaint
And dies beneath the Blows.

Inhuman Wretch! say whence proceeds
This coward Cruelty?
What Int'rest springs from barb'rous deeds?
What Joy from Misery?

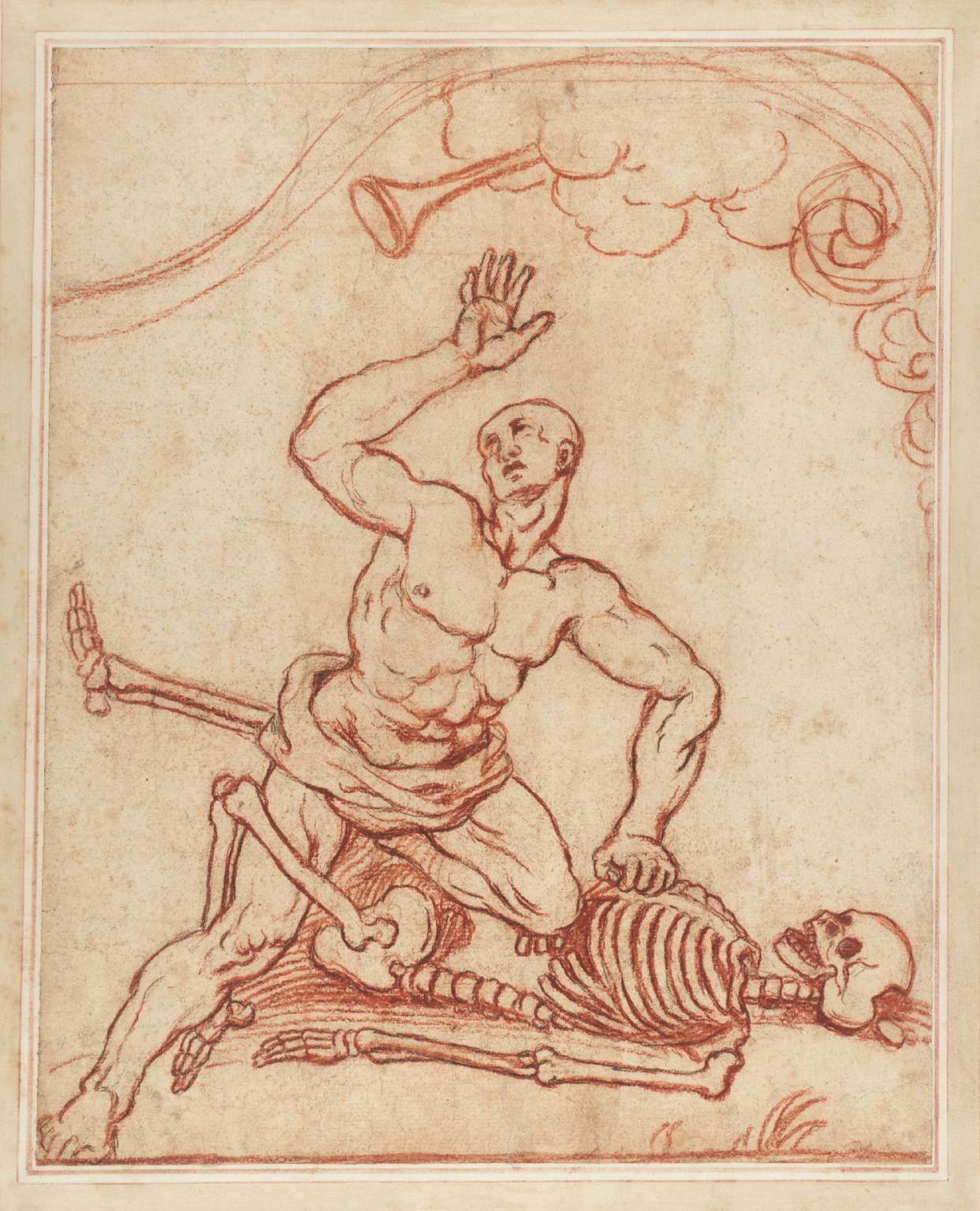
George Taylor Triumphing over Death

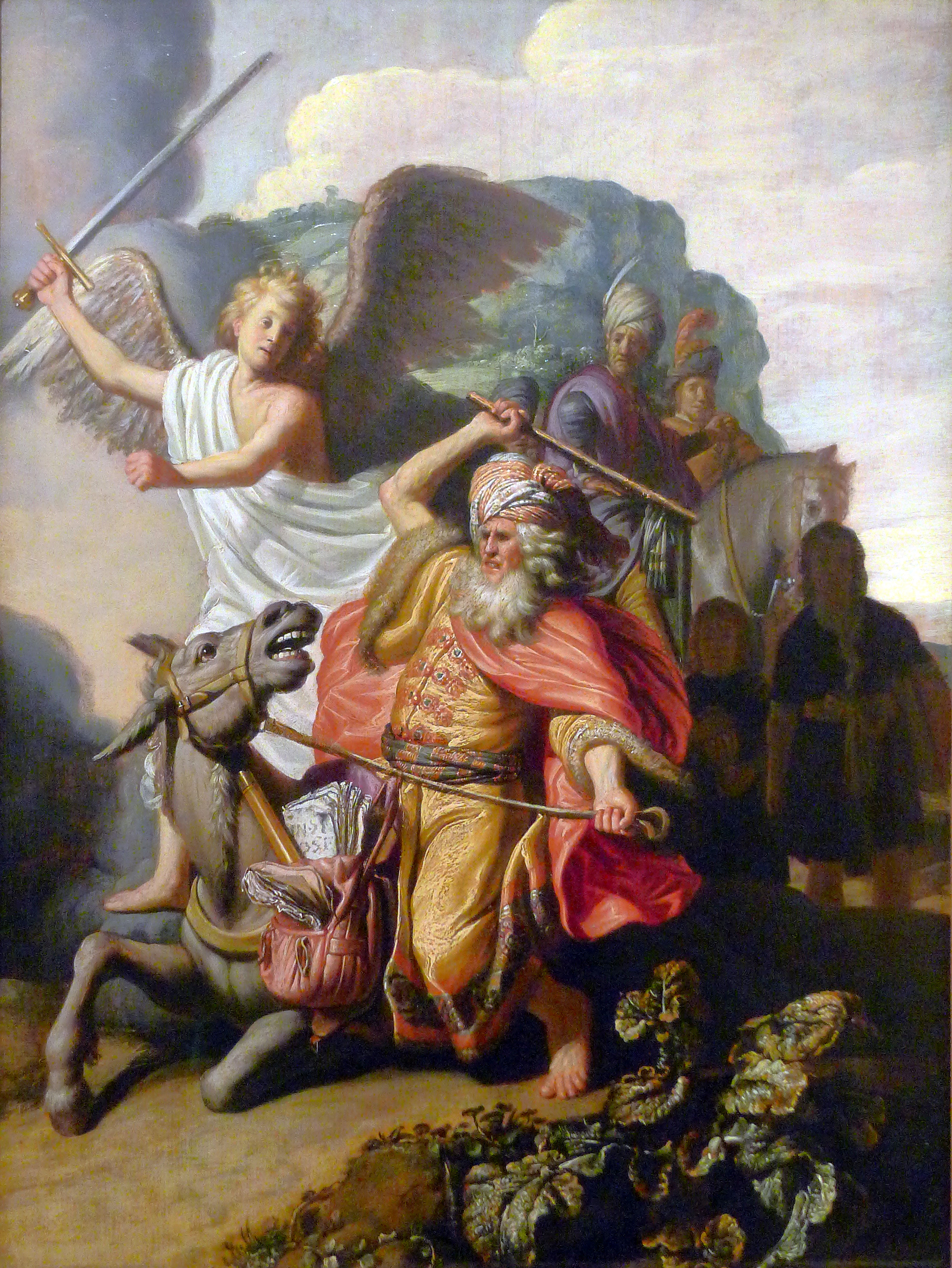
Rembrandt, Balaam and the Ass

The cruelty has also advanced to include abuse of people. A dray crushes a playing boy while the drayman sleeps, oblivious to the boy's injury and the beer spilling from his barrels. Posters in the background advertise a cockfight and a boxing match as further evidence of the brutal entertainments favoured by the subjects of the image. The boxing match is to take place at Broughton's Amphitheatre, a notoriously tough venue established by the "father of pugilism", Jack Broughton: a contemporary bill records that the contestants would fight with their left leg strapped to the floor, with the one with the fewest bleeding wounds being adjudged the victor. One of the advertised participants in the boxing match is James Field, who was hanged two weeks before the prints were issued and features again in the final image of the series; the other participant is George "the Barber" Taylor, who had been champion of England but was defeated by Broughton and retired in 1750. On Taylor's death in 1757, Hogarth produced a number of sketches of him wrestling Death, probably for his tomb.^{[b]}

According to Werner Busch, the composition alludes to Rembrandt's painting Balaam's Ass (1626).

In an echo of the first plate, there is but one person who shows concern for the welfare of the tormented horse. To the left of Nero, and almost unseen, a man notes down Nero's hackney coach number to report him.

=== Cruelty in perfection ===
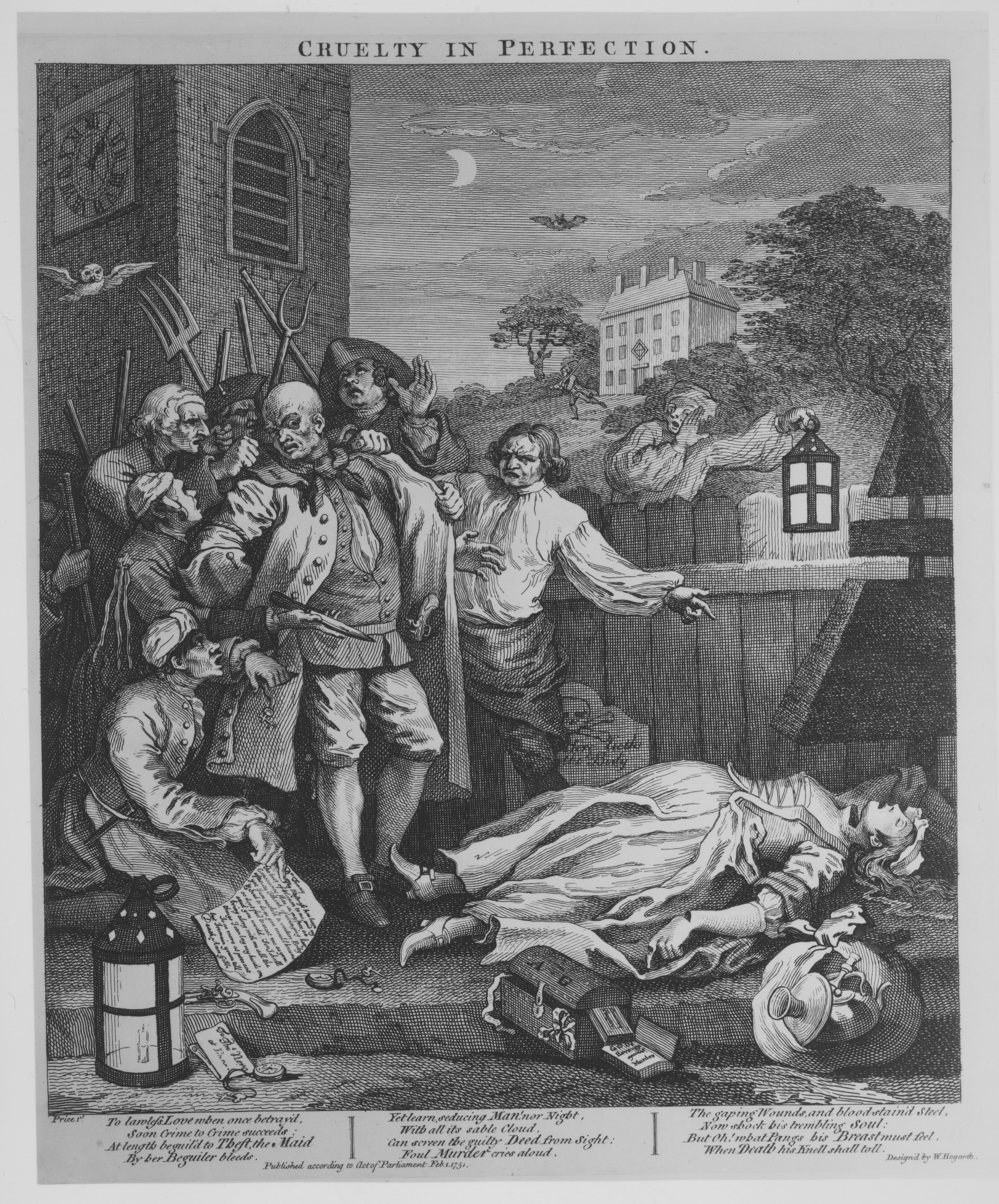
Cruelty in perfection (Plate III)

By the time of the third plate, Tom Nero has progressed from the mistreatment of animals to theft and murder. Having encouraged his pregnant lover, Ann Gill, to rob and leave her mistress, he murders the girl when she meets him. The murder is shown to be particularly brutal: her neck, wrist, and index finger are almost severed. Her trinket box^{[c]} and the goods she had stolen lie on the ground beside her, and the index finger of her partially severed hand points to the words "God's Revenge against Murder" written on a book that, along with the Book of Common Prayer, has fallen from the box. A woman searching Nero's pockets uncovers pistols, a number of pocket watches—evidence of his having turned to highway robbery (as Tom Idle did in Industry and Idleness), and a letter from Ann Gill which reads:

Dear Tommy
My mistress has been the best of women to me, and my conscience flies in my face as often as I think of wronging her; yet I am resolved to venture body and soul to do as you would have me, so do not fail to meet me as you said you would, for I will bring along with me all the things I can lay my hands on. So no more at present; but I remain yours till death.
Ann Gill.

The spelling is perfect and while this is perhaps unrealistic, Hogarth deliberately avoids any chance of the scene becoming comical. A discarded envelope is addressed "To Tho^{s} Nero at Pinne...". Ronald Paulson sees a parallel between the lamb beaten to death in the Second Stage and the defenceless girl murdered here. Below the print, the text claims that Nero, if not repentant, is at least stunned by his actions:

To lawless Love when once betray'd.
Soon Crime to Crime succeeds:
At length beguil'd to Theft, the Maid
By her Beguiler bleeds.

Yet learn, seducing Man! nor Night,
With all its sable Cloud,
can screen the guilty Deed from sight;
Foul Murder cries aloud.

The gaping Wounds and bloodstain'd steel,
Now shock his trembling Soul:
But Oh! what Pangs his Breast must feel,
When Death his Knell shall toll.

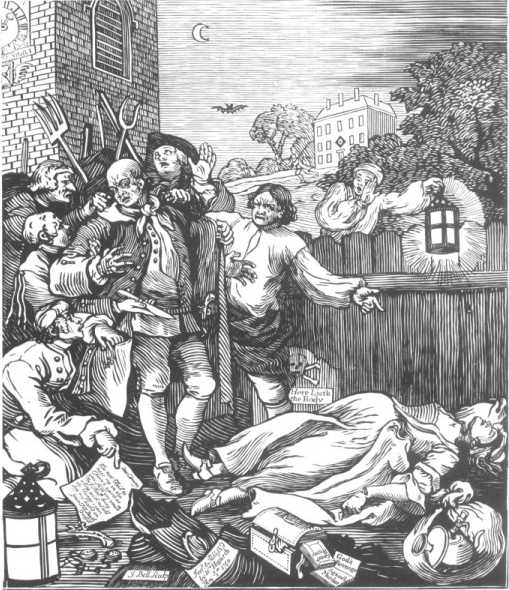
In Bell's woodcut, a log in the foreground bears his and Hogarth's names and the date.

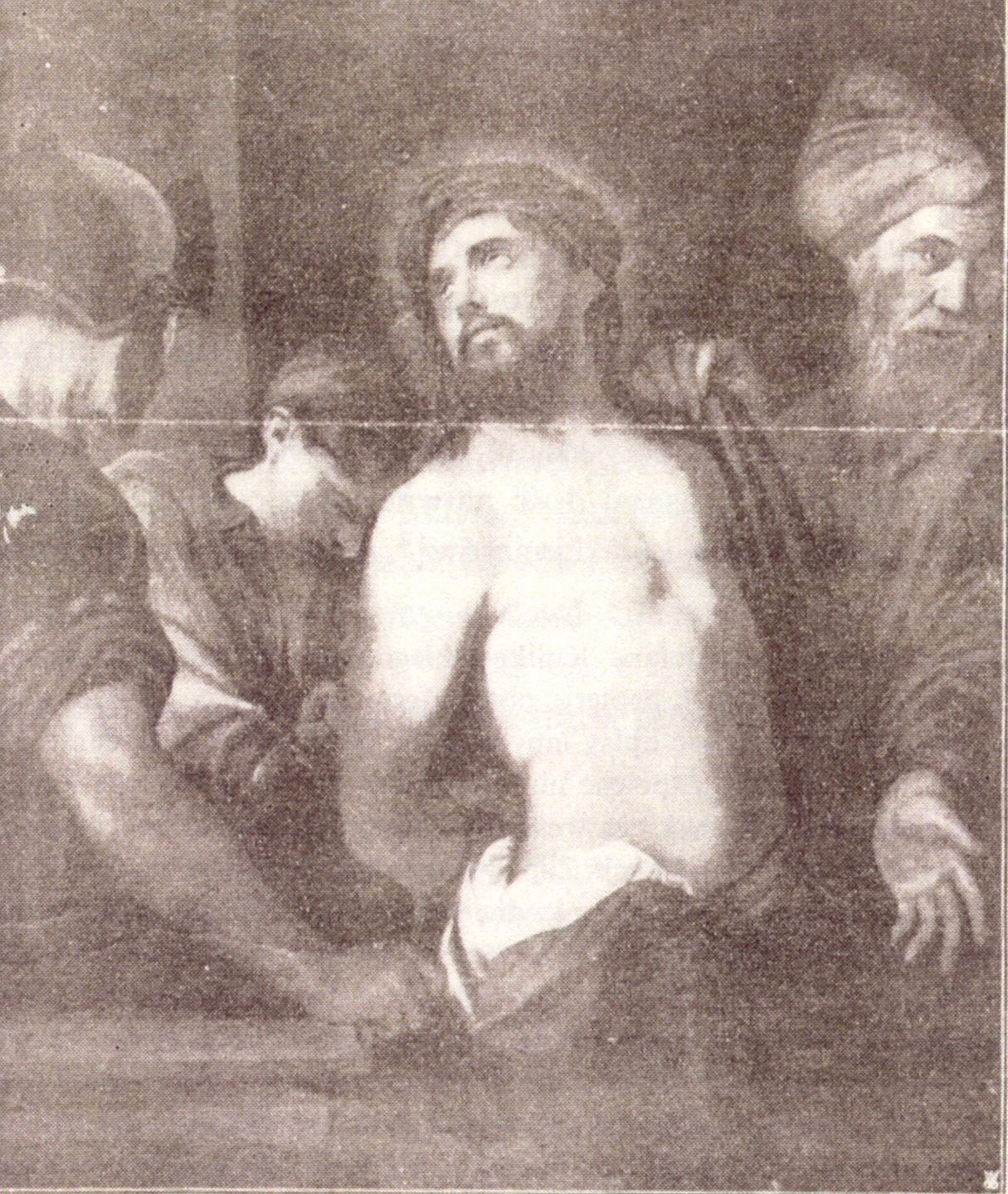
Van Dyck's "Ecce Homo"

Various features in the print are meant to intensify the feelings of dread: the murder takes place in a graveyard, said to be St Pancras but suggested by John Ireland to resemble Marylebone; an owl and a bat fly around the scene; the moon shines down on the crime; the clock strikes one for the end of the witching hour. The composition of the image may allude to Anthony van Dyck's The Arrest of Christ. A lone Good Samaritan appears again: among the snarling faces of Tom's accusers, a single face looks to the heavens in pity.

In the alternative image for this stage, produced as a woodcut by Bell, Tom is shown with his hands free. There are also differences in the wording of the letter and some items, like the lantern and books, are larger and simpler while others, such as the man to the left of Tom and the topiary bush, have been removed. The owl has become a winged hourglass on the clock tower.

=== The reward of cruelty ===
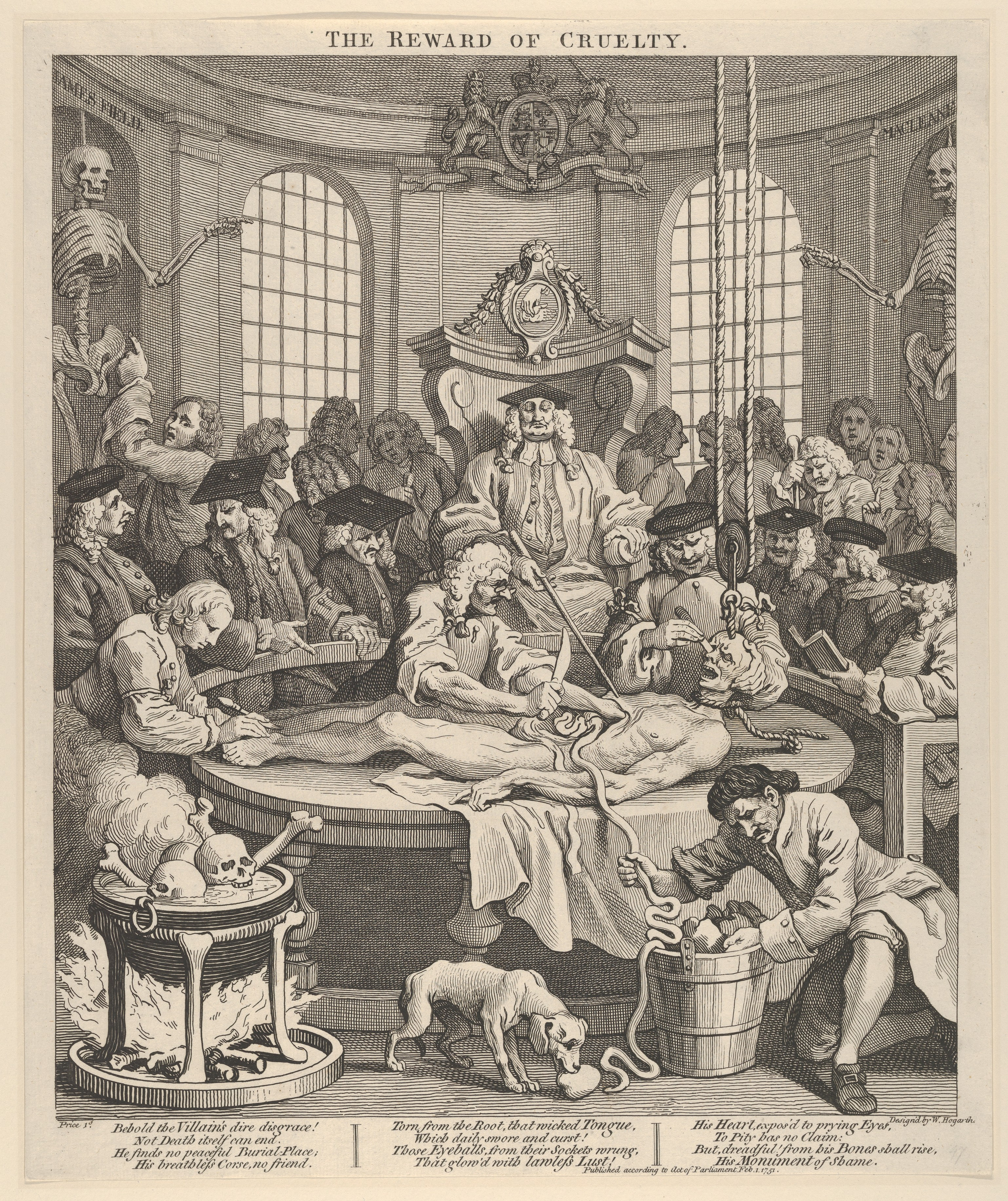
The reward of cruelty (Plate IV)

Having been tried and found guilty of murder, Nero has now been hanged and his body taken for the ignominious process of public dissection. The year after the prints were issued, the Murder Act 1752 would ensure that the bodies of murderers could be delivered to the surgeons so they could be "dissected and anatomised". It was hoped this further punishment on the body and denial of burial would act as a deterrent. At the time Hogarth made the engravings, this right was not enshrined in law, but the surgeons still removed bodies when they could.

A tattoo on his arm identifies Tom Nero, and the rope still around his neck shows his method of execution. The dissectors, their hearts hardened after years of working with cadavers, are shown to have as much feeling for the body as Nero had for his victims; his eye is put out just as his horse's was, and a dog feeds on his heart, taking a poetic revenge for the torture inflicted on one of its kind in the first plate. Nero's face appears contorted in agony and although this depiction is not realistic, Hogarth meant it to heighten the fear for the audience. Just as his murdered mistress's finger pointed to Nero's destiny in Cruelty in Perfection, in this print Nero's finger points to the boiled bones being prepared for display, indicating his ultimate fate.

While the surgeons working on the body are observed by the mortar-boarded academics in the front row, the physicians, who can be identified by their wigs and canes, largely ignore the dissection and consult among themselves. The president has been identified as John Freke, president of the Royal College of Surgeons at the time.^{[d]} Freke had been involved in the high-profile attempt to secure the body of condemned rioter Bosavern Penlez for dissection in 1749. Aside from the over-enthusiastic dissection of the body and the boiling of the bones in situ, the image portrays the procedure as it would have been carried out.

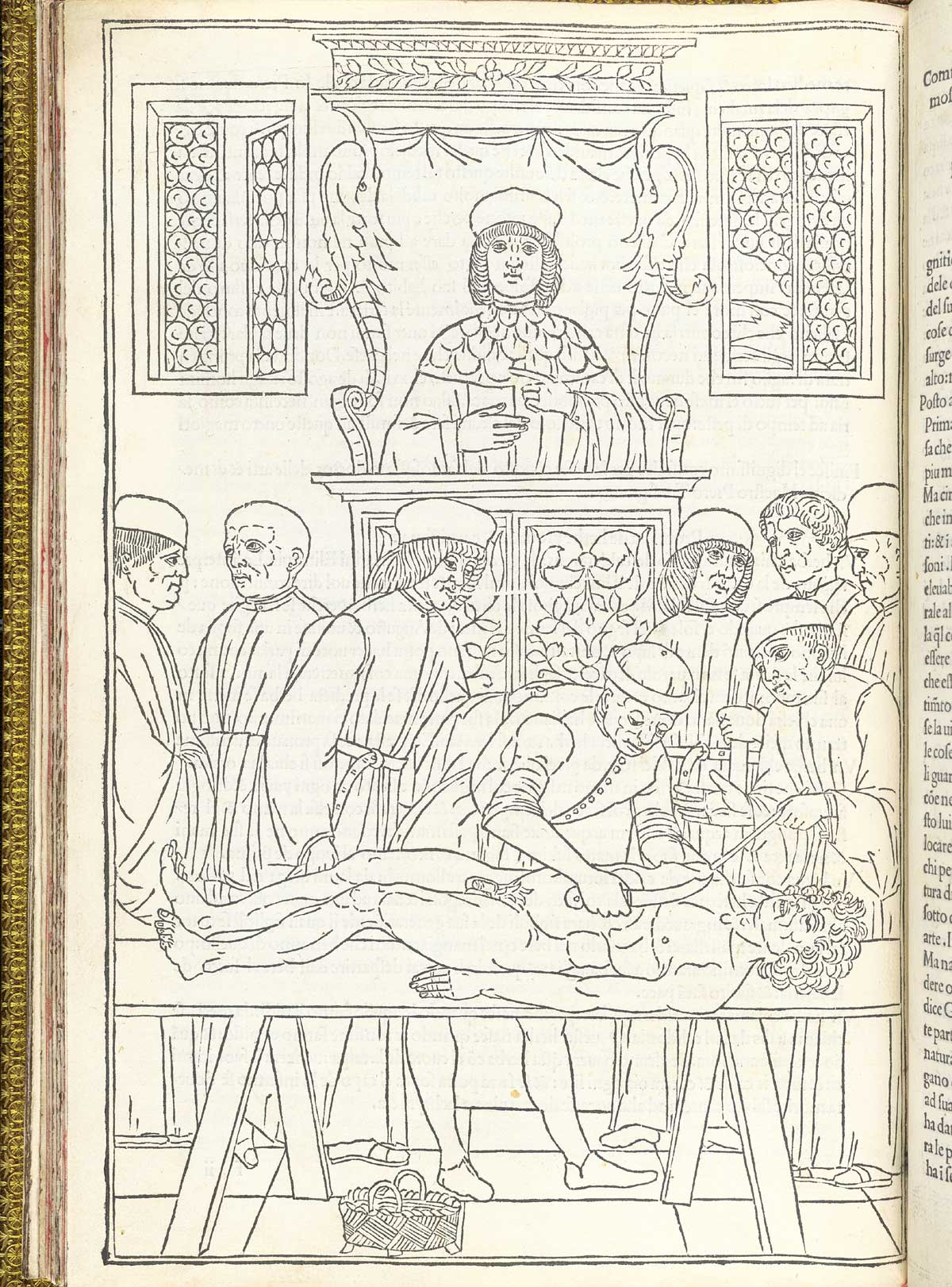
This woodcut image from 1495 has many of the basic elements of Hogarth's picture.

Two skeletons to the rear left and right of the print are labelled as James Field, a well-known boxer who also featured on a poster in the second plate, and Macleane, an infamous highwayman. Both men were hanged shortly before the print was published (Macleane in 1750 and Field in 1751). The skeletons seemingly point to one another. Field's name above the skeleton on the left may have been a last minute substitution for "GENTL HARRY" referring to Henry Simms, also known as Young Gentleman Harry. Simms was a robber who was executed in 1747. The motif of the lone "good man" is carried through to this final plate, where one of the academics points at the skeleton of James Field, indicating the inevitable outcome for those who start down the path of cruelty.

The composition of the scene is a pastiche of the frontispiece of Andreas Vesalius's De humani corporis fabrica, and it possibly also borrows from Quack Physicians' Hall (c. 1730) by the Dutch artist Egbert van Heemskerck, who had lived in England and whose work Hogarth admired. An earlier source of inspiration may have been a woodcut in the 1495 Fasciculo di medicina by Johannes de Ketham which, although simpler, has many of the same elements, including the seated president flanked by two windows.

Below the print are these final words:

Behold the Villain's dire disgrace!
Not Death itself can end.
He finds no peaceful Burial-Place,
His breathless Corse, no friend.

Torn from the Root, that wicked Tongue,
Which daily swore and curst!
Those Eyeballs from their Sockets wrung,
That glow'd with lawless Lust!

His Heart expos'd to prying Eyes,
To Pity has no claim;
But, dreadful! from his Bones shall rise,
His Monument of Shame.

== Reception ==
Hogarth was pleased with the results. European Magazine reported that he commented to a bookseller from Cornhill (a Mr. Sewell):

there is no part of my works of which I am so proud, and in which I now feel so happy, as in the series of The Four Stages of Cruelty because I believe the publication of theme has checked the diabolical spirit of barbarity to the brute creation which, I am sorry to say, was once so prevalent in this country.

— European Magazine, June 1801

In his unfinished Apology for Painters he commented further:

I had rather, if cruelty has been prevented by the four prints, be the maker of them than the [Raphael] cartoons, unless I lived in a Roman Catholic country.

In his 1817 book Shakespeare and His Times, Nathan Drake credits the representation of "throwing at cocks" in the first plate for changing public opinion about the practice, which was common at the time, and prompting magistrates to take a harder line on offenders. In his "Lectures on Ethics" Immanuel Kant refers to the engravings as an example of how cruelty towards animals leads indirectly to failing duties towards humans as Hogarth "brings home to us the terrible rewards of cruelty, and this should be an impressive lesson to children." Others found the series less to their liking. Charles Lamb dismissed the series as mere caricature, not worthy to be included alongside Hogarth's other work, but rather something produced as the result of a "wayward humour" outside of his normal habits. Art historian Allan Cunningham also had strong feelings about the series:

I wish it had never been painted. There is indeed great skill in the grouping, and profound knowledge of character; but the whole effect is gross, brutal and revolting. A savage boy grows into a savage man, and concludes a career of cruelty and outrage by an atrocious murder, for which he is hanged and dissected.

The Anatomy Act 1832 ended the dissection of murderers, and most of the animal tortures depicted were outlawed by the Cruelty to Animals Act 1835, so by the 1850s The Four Stages of Cruelty had come to be viewed as a somewhat historical series, though still one with the power to shock, a power it retains for a modern audience.

== See also ==
- List of works by William Hogarth
- Before 1900s in comics

== Notes ==
a. A pair of impressions from Bell's original printing were acquired for £1600 by the University of Glasgow's Hunterian Museum and Art Gallery in 2005.

b. There is some confusion over the date of George "The Barber" Taylor's career and death. In his earlier work Paulson puts him as a pupil of Broughton, killed in a fight with him in 1750, and the Tate Gallery dates Hogarth's sketches to c. 1750. In Hogarth's "Harlot", he states that Taylor retired in 1750 but came out of retirement in 1757 for a final fight in which he was badly beaten, dying from his injuries several months later. Most records date Taylor's championship to the middle 1730s.

c. The initials on the box are normally read as A. G. for Ann Gill, but the G resembles a D, suggesting the box too may have been stolen.

d. John Ireland identifies the president as "Mr Frieake, the master of Nourse, to whom Mr Potts was a pupil". Since Ireland identifies him as the master of Nourse, he undoubtedly means John Freke, an acquaintance of Hogarth's and surgeon at St Bartholomew's Hospital from 1729 to 1755 and a Governor from 1736 to 1756. The dissection could be taking place at St Bartholomew's Hospital, where all three surgeons were based, but it also has features of the Cutlerian Theatre of the Royal College of Physicians near Newgate (particularly the throne, which bears their arms, and its curved wall resembling a cockpit) and the niches of the Barber-Surgeons' Hall (which was not used for dissection after the surgeons split away to form the Company of Surgeons in 1745).
