= Industry and Idleness =

Series of engravings created by William Hogarth

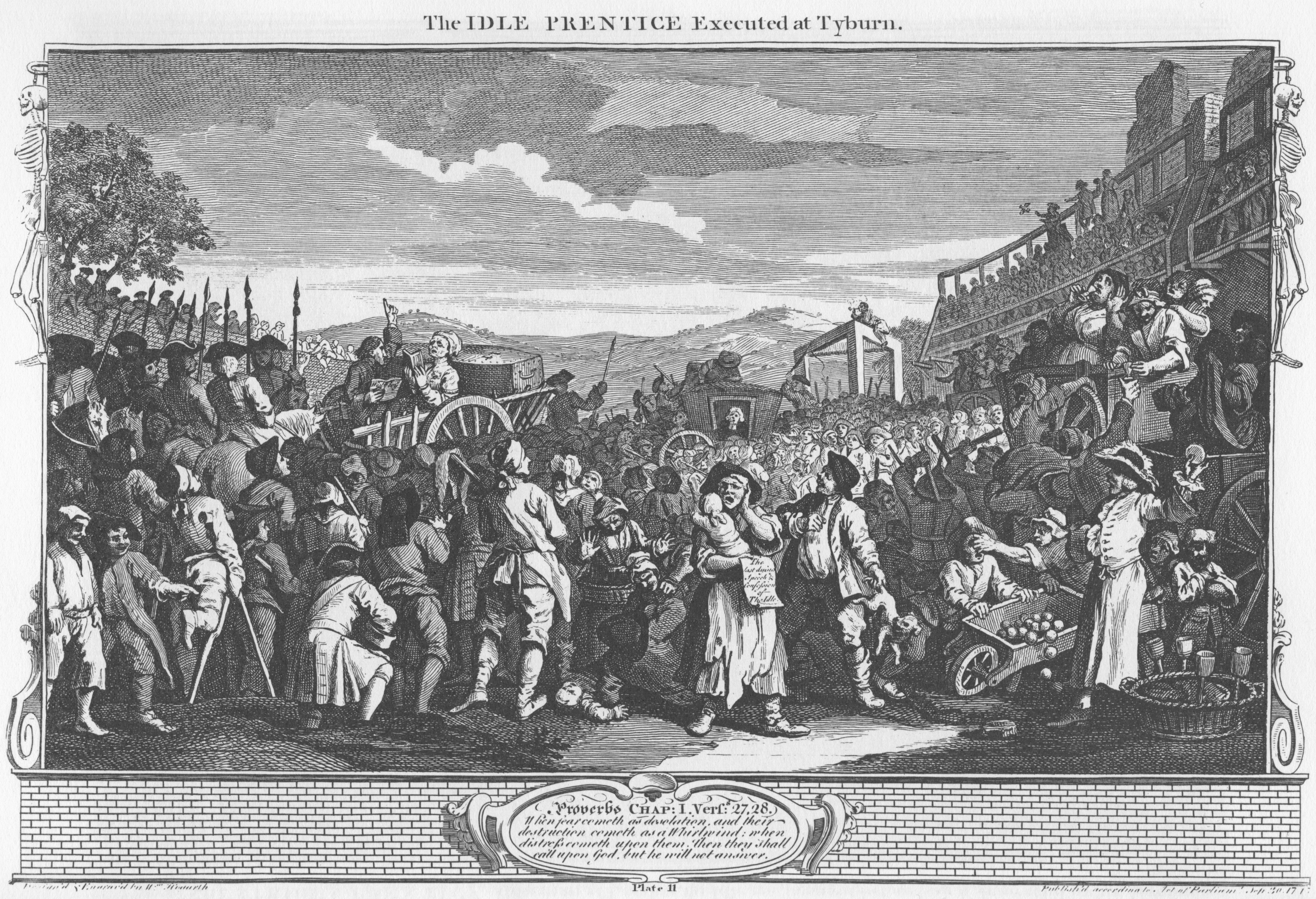
The Idle 'Prentice Executed at Tyburn — Plate 11 of 12 of the series, showing the final reward of idleness

Industry and Idleness is the title of a series of 12 plot-linked engravings created by the English artist William Hogarth in 1747, intending to illustrate to working children the possible rewards of hard work and diligent application and the sure disasters attending a lack of both. Unlike his earlier works, such as A Harlot's Progress (1731) and Marriage à-la-mode (1743), which were painted first and subsequently converted to engravings, Industry and Idleness was created solely as a set of engravings. Each of the prints was sold for one shilling each so 12 shillings for the entire set, which is equivalent to £120 in 2023. It may be assumed that these prints were aimed for a wider and less wealthy market than his earlier works. The originals currently reside at the British Museum.

== Antecedents ==
Hogarth was far from the first to attempt to dramatically display parallel lives leading from the same start to opposite ends. Paulson suggests two: the plays "Eastward Hoe" (Revived after Hogarth's publication of these) and "The London Merchant", the latter containing the especially applicable quote that "business [is] the youth's best preservative from ill, as idleness [is] the worst of snares". He also suggests that Hogarth already had the idea when he painted "Hudibras and the Lawyer" with its two (industrious and idle) clerks.

== Format ==
Each print shows a representative or important scene at some point in the life of one of the protagonists (In two plates, both are shown together). Together, the seven appearances of Francis Goodchild and Thomas Idle show their steady paths up the social and political ladder to the pinnacle of power and esteem and down the path of immorality and crime to complete disgrace and legal infamy, respectively. Each appearance is also accompanied by some explanatory or foreshadowing text from the Bible.

This latter was supposedly picked out by a friend of Hogarth's, Rev. Arnold King.

== The engravings ==
The plates show one of the two apprentices at some stage in their life, alternating between one 'prentice and the other (Industrious, Idle, Industrious, etc.) with the exceptions of 1 and 10 where both are shown. Each has a Biblical quotation relevant to the scene.

=== Plate 1 – The Fellow 'Prentices at their Looms ===
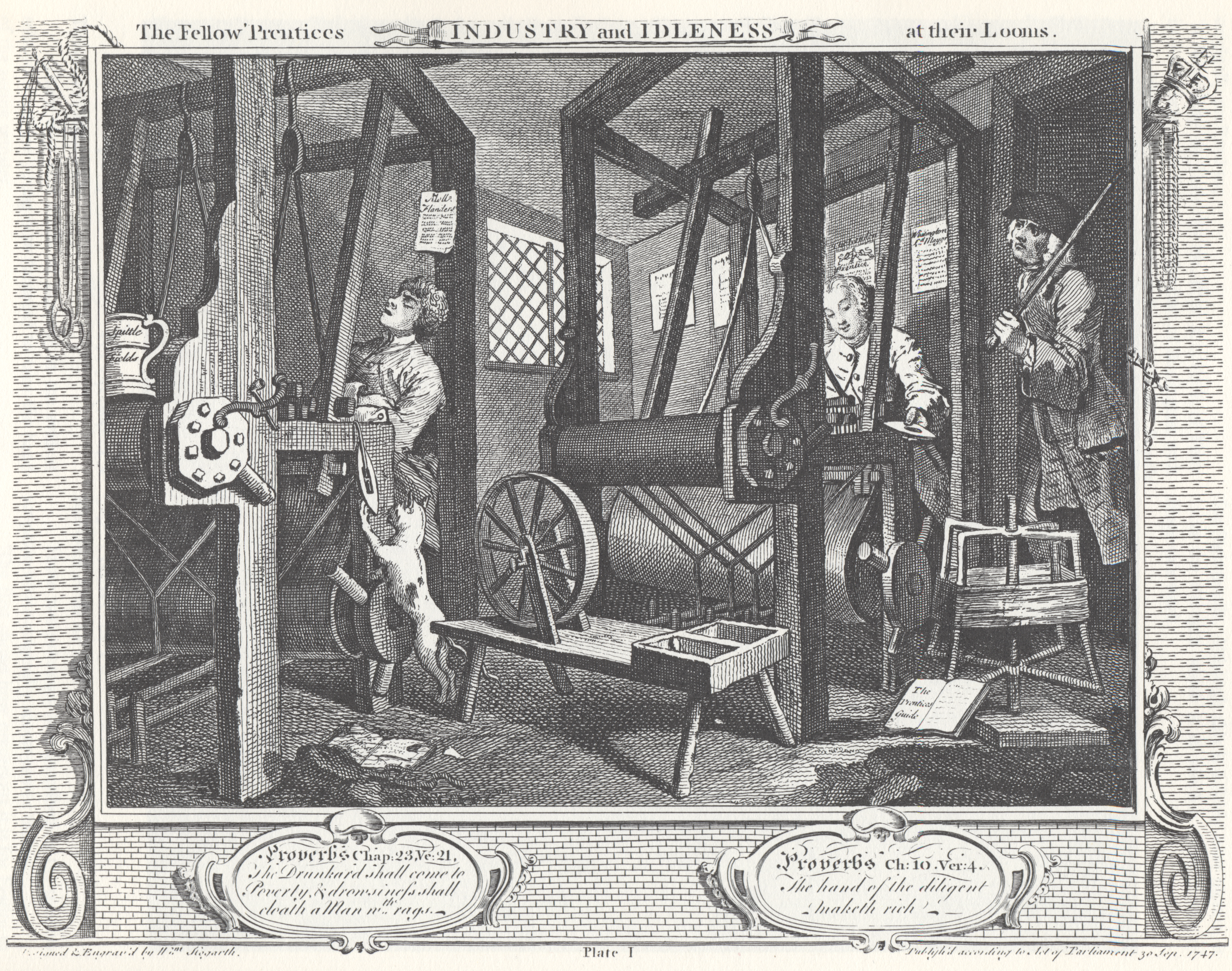
Exactly equal footing at their first meeting. Tom is on the left, Francis on the right and the master weaver on the extreme right

In plate 1 the two protagonists are introduced: both are "'prentices" on equal terms with their master, and doing the same work.

Beyond this framework, the two characters display their respective traits: Francis is busy at work with his loom and shuttle, with his copy of "The Prentice's Guide" at his feet and various wholesome literature tacked up on the wall behind him such as "The London Prentice" and (portentously) "Whitington L^{d} Mayor".

Tom Idle leans snoring against his still loom, probably as a result of a huge mug labelled "Spittle Fields" sitting on his loom. A clay pipe is wedged into the handle and a cat is busy interfering with the shuttle. Tacked to the post that he is sleeping against is "Moll Flanders"; his "Prentice's Guide" is also lying on the ground, but in a filthy and shredded state.

To the right their master, with a thick stick in his hand, looks disappointedly at Thomas.

The future courses of the two apprentices are marked off for them by the imagery surrounding the frame of the painting: To the left, representing Idle's future, a whip, fetters and a rope; to the right, over Goodchild, a ceremonial mace, sword of state and golden chain. The master's sword segues exactly into the shaft of the mace: more foreshadowing for the second encounter of the two in plate 10.

Idle's verse:

Proverbs Chap: 23 Ve: 21
The Drunkard shall come to
Poverty, & drowsineſs shall
cloath a Man w^{th} rags

Goodchild's:

Proverbs Ch:10 Ver:4
The hand of the diligent
maketh rich

=== Plate 2 — The Industrious 'Prentice performing the Duty of a Christian ===
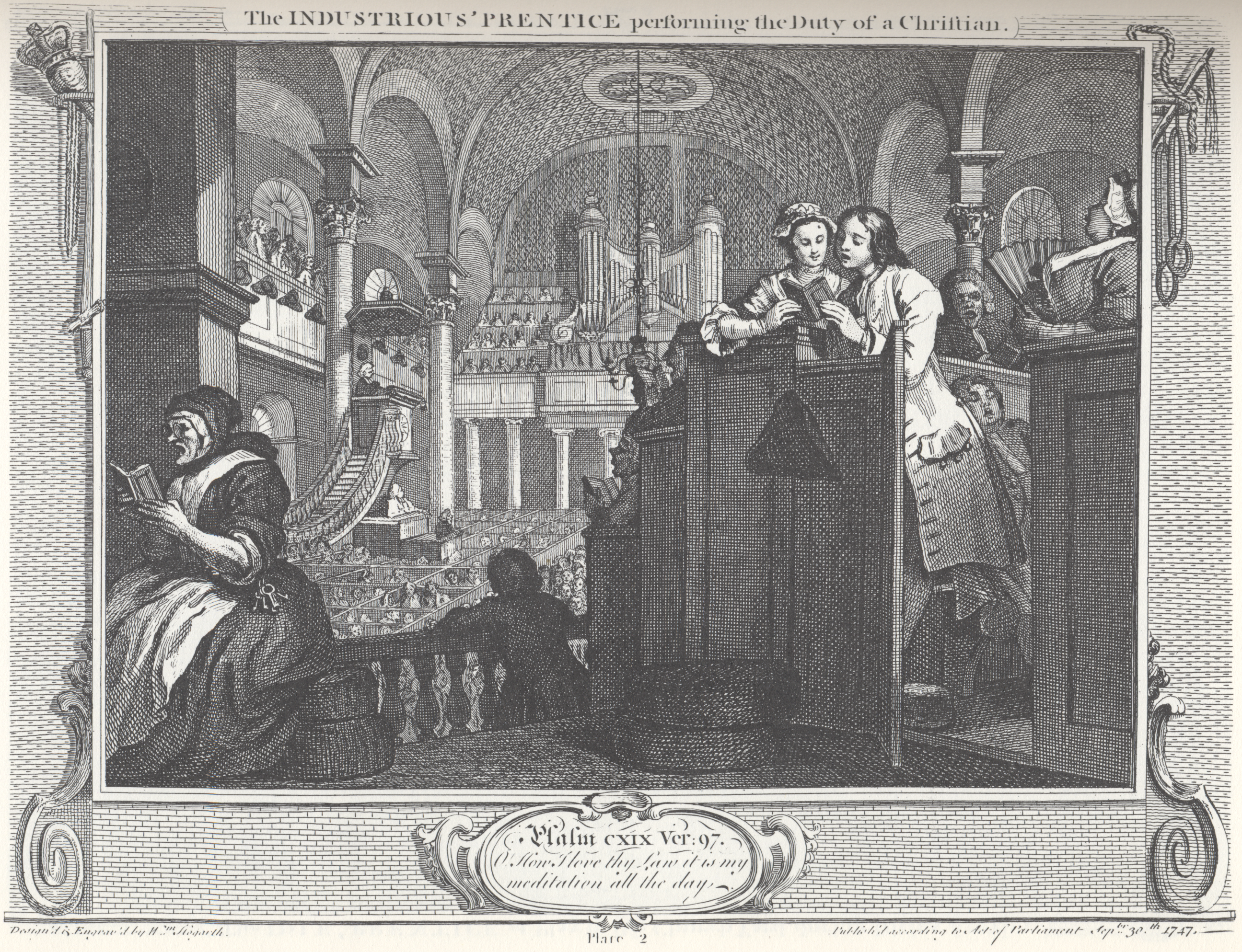
Goodchild in church, singing hymns

Plate two occurs at some point on a Sunday, when their master has given them part (or all) of the day to attend church service. Francis Goodchild is shown taking good advantage of this, attending St. Martin-in-the-Fields, standing in a pew with his master's daughter, singing out of a hymnal. Their piety is contrasted with the sleeping man in the pew and the vain woman at the far right, and complements the quiet devotion of the old pew opener, the woman who has the keys to the pew, who is facing away from the service to spot new arrivals.

Significantly, since this is the first in the series of images of Francis' fortune, his career is literally shown to start with his devotion.

Note the tricorns hanging everywhere.

Psalm CXIX Ver:97
O! How I love thy Law it is my
meditation all day

=== Plate 3 — The Idle 'Prentice at Play in the Church Yard, during Divine Service ===
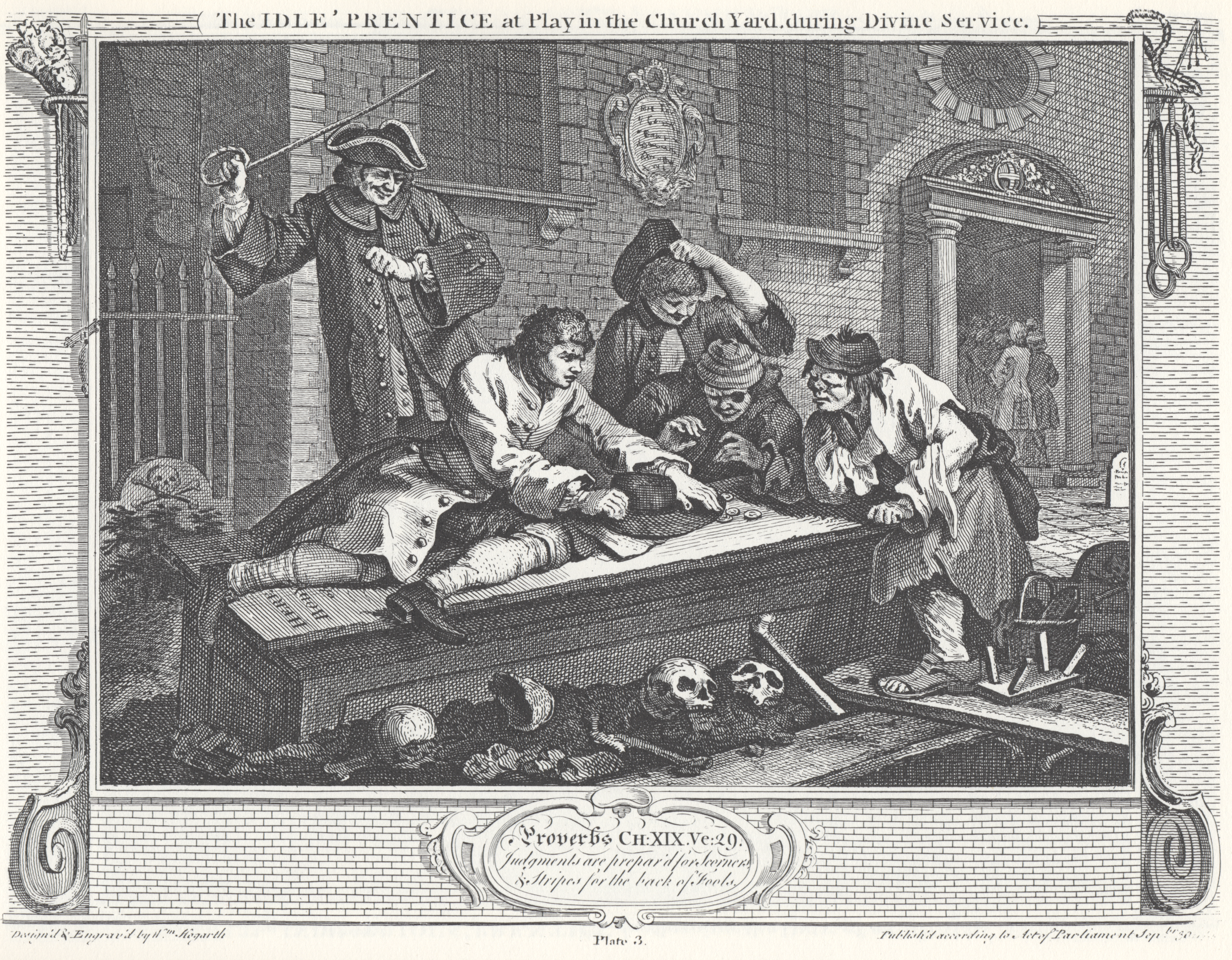
Not outside the same church

In this case, Tom Idle is shown doing the exact opposite: gambling and cheating with some pence on top of a tomb in the churchyard. The foreground is strewn with spare bones and skulls, and behind him a beadle is about to strike him with a cane for his insolence and tardiness.

Also note that the frame is reversed: Now the mace, etc. are on the left of the engraving.

Proverbs CH:XIX. Ve:29.
Judgments are prepared for scorners
& stripes for the back of Fools

=== Plate 4 — The Industrious 'Prentice a Favourite, and entrusted by his Master ===
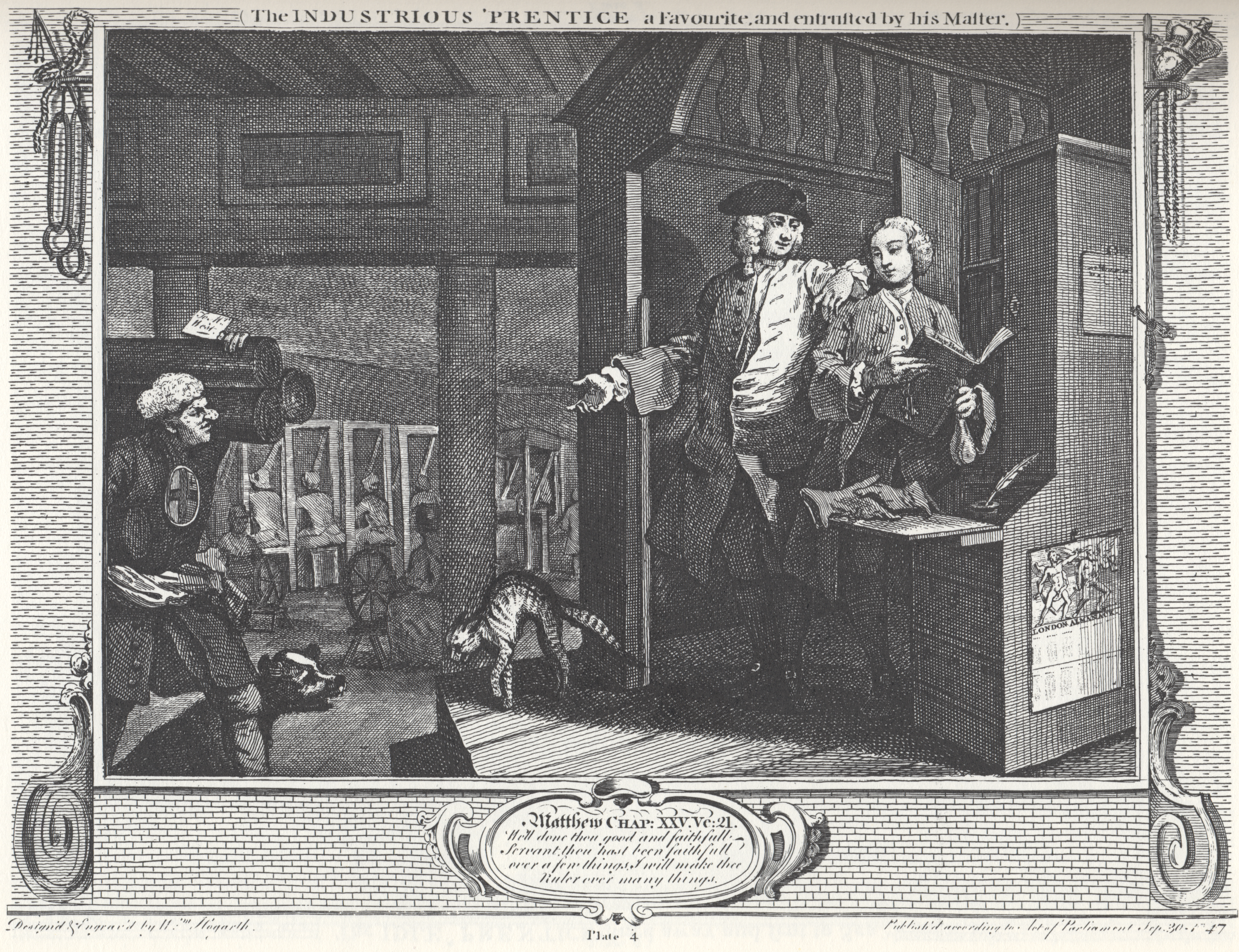
Francis finds people clearly appreciative of his steady-going ways

Clearly Goodchild's industry and piety are paying off. He is now no longer working a loom, but rather keeping his master's business: He holds the "Day Book", keys to the house and a pouch of money. His master is also present and using the greatest familiarity with him, further testifying to his advanced state. On the desk before them two gloves shaking hands illustrate the friendship and foreshadow their ultimate harmony and agreement in plate 6.

Behind them are a row of women at looms and one at a spinning wheel and to the left, a man wearing the symbol of the Corporation of London and carrying material in labelled "To M^{r} West". Both show that the business is a going concern.

To the lower right a copy of the "London Almanack" is tacked up, headed by an allegorical figure of the genius of Industry assaulting Father Time. A dog stands by the carrier, annoying a cat up on the platform West and Goodchild stand on.

Matthew CHAP:XXV. Ve:21.
Well done good and faithfull
servant thou hast been faithfull
over a few things, I will make thee
Ruler over many things

=== Plate 5 — The Idle 'Prentice turn'd away, and sent to Sea ===
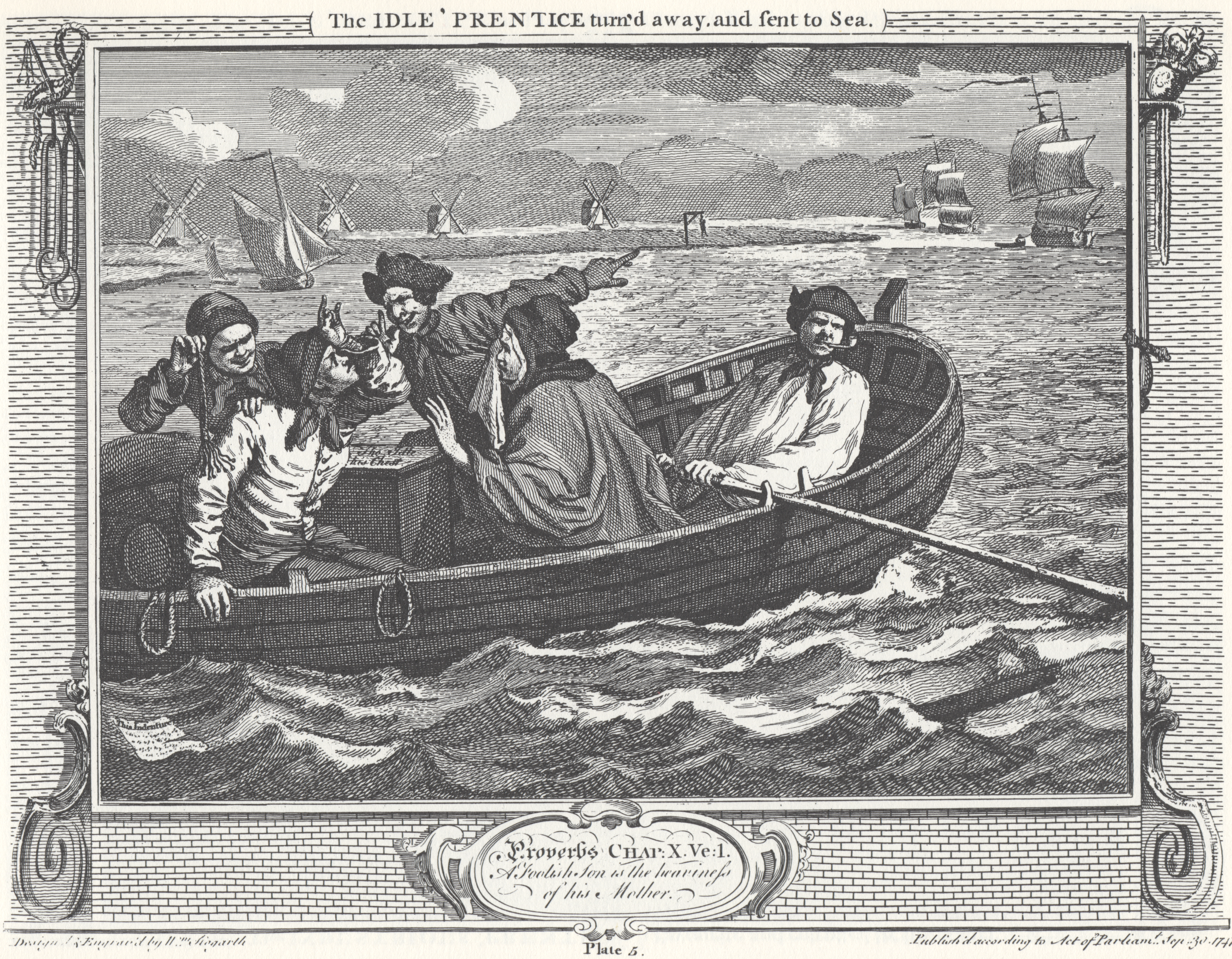
Tom finally exhausts everyone's patience – except his mother's

On the other hand, Tom Idle's useless ways have finally gotten their reward: His master (possibly with the consultation of or incitement by Francis) either throws him out or orders him away to sea. In either case, Tom clearly feels that his authority over him is at an end and has cast his indenture into the boat's wake in the lower left-hand corner.

Judging by his companions' antics, his reputation of laziness and disobedience have preceded him: One tries to tease him with the frayed end of a rope (i.e. a cat o' nine tails), the other points towards a man hanging from a gibbet at the waterline for some nautical crime (It is also possible he's pointing at their ship). The sky also grows noticeably darker in the direction their boat is pointed.

For the first time, we learn his name from the wooden crate next to him labelled "Tho Idle his Chest". An old woman, dressed as a widow, tearfully remonstrates with him, while he ignores her. The verse at the bottom clearly indicates this is his mother.

In the background, on low land, are a number of Dutch windmills.

Proverbs CHAP:X. Ve:1.
A foolish son is the heavineſs
of his Mother

=== Plate 6 — The Industrious 'Prentice out of his Time, & Married to his Master's Daughter ===
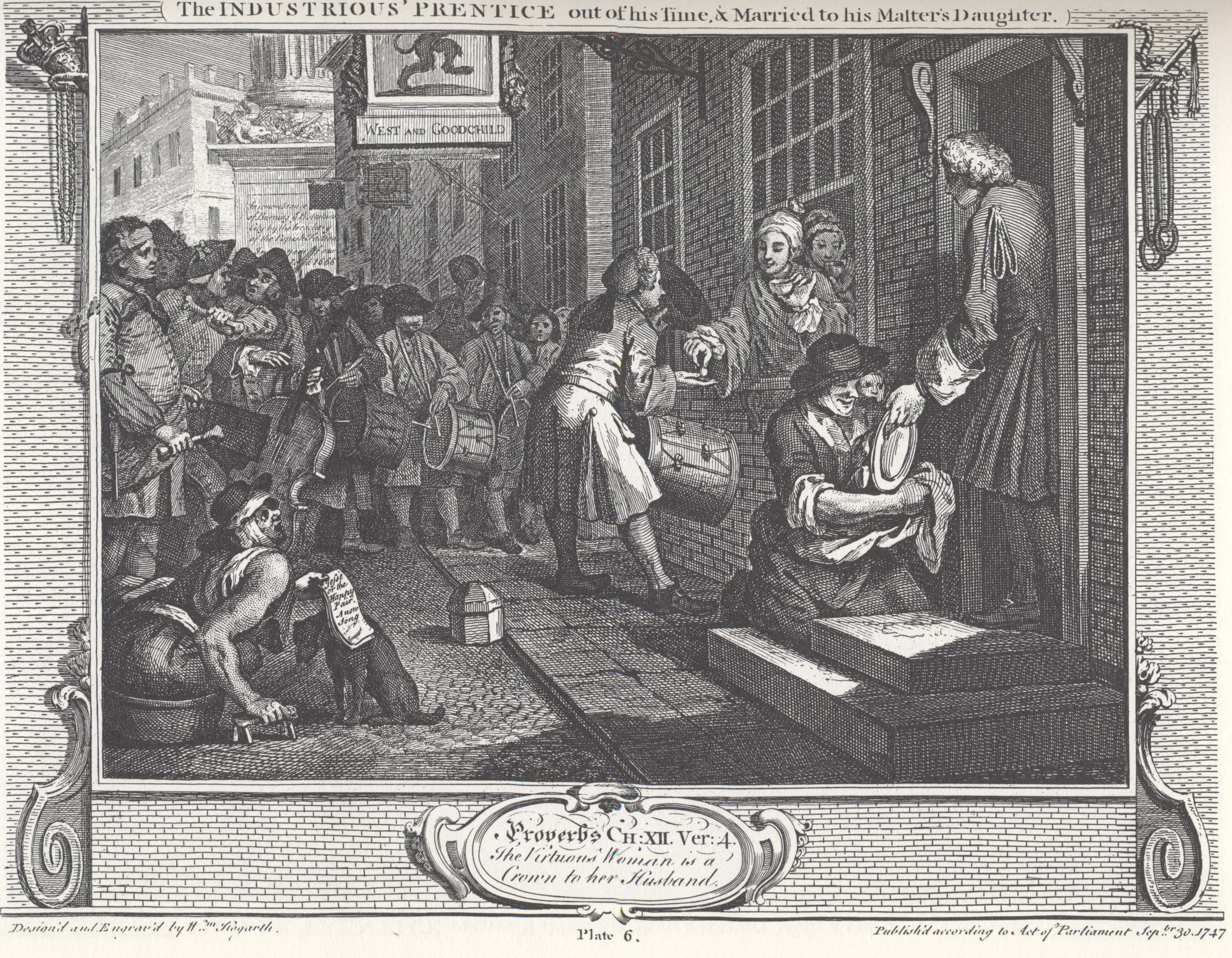
Mr. and Mrs. Goodchild

The next plate shows that Francis Goodchild has been improving his time, as usual. He has also escaped his apprenticeship, but in the intended manner: having served his time, he is free and a journeyman weaver. Beyond that even, the sign of "WEST and GOODCHILD" under their trademark of a lion rampant shows that his former master has taken him into partnership (not an unreasonable step given that he previously kept the accounts).

The other significant change is that Miss West, last seen in Plate 2, has become Mrs. Goodchild. The scene here is likely the day after, when they distribute the remnants of the feast to various poor people.

Francis is at the window holding a teacup (without a handle) and giving a coin. In the foreground at the door a footman gives away a plate. To the left, a legless man in a tub, probably invalided from the Army or Navy, holds out a sheet of paper containing "Jeſse or the Happy Pair. a new Song". Behind him a Frenchman with a bass viol is forced out of the line by a (British) butcher.

The background shows the London Monument when it contained the lines "by the treachery of the Popish Faction."

Proverbs CH:XII. Ver:4.
The Virtuous Woman is a
Crown to her Husband.

=== Plate 7 — The Idle 'Prentice return'd from Sea, & in a Garret with common Prostitute ===
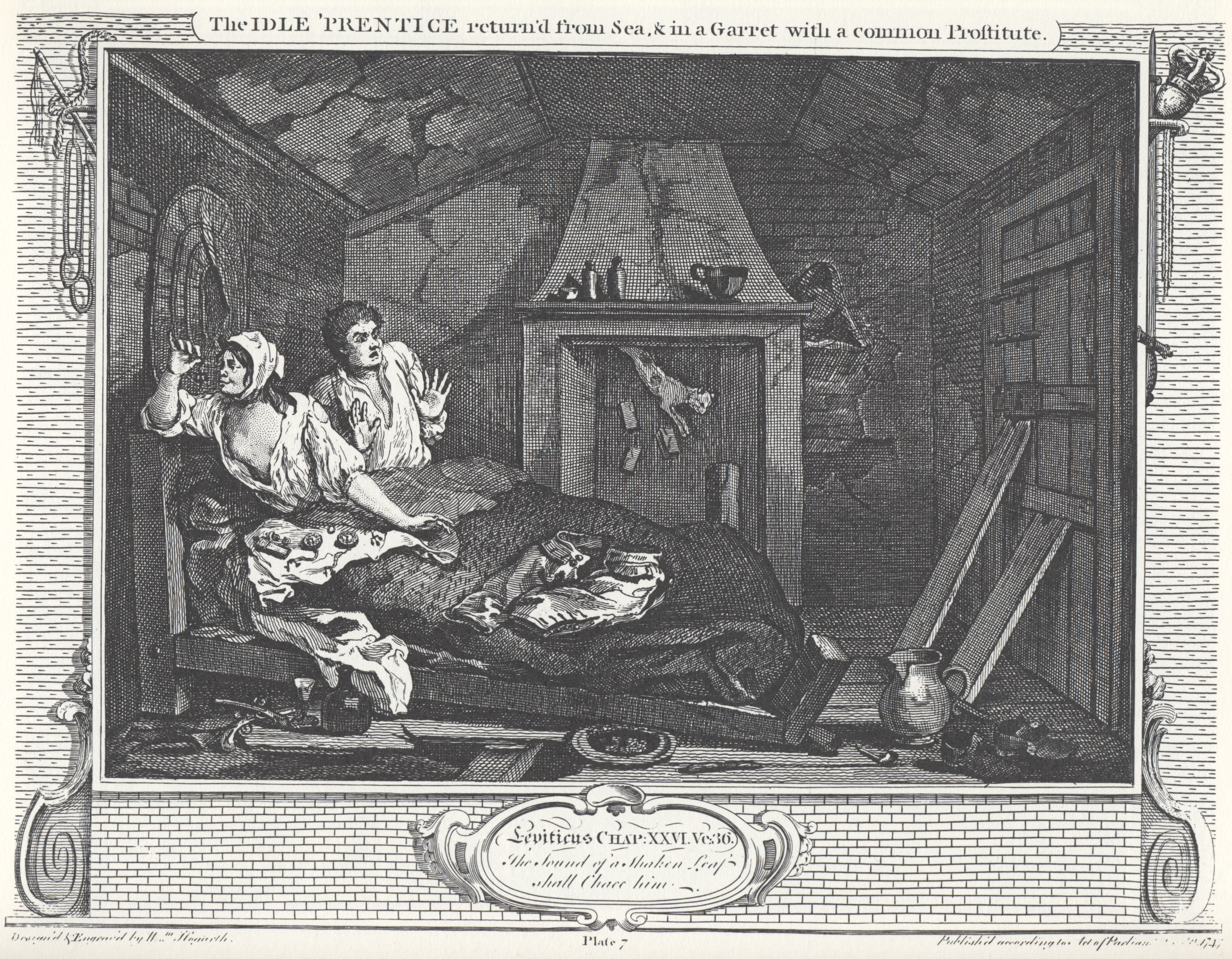
Not fighting the Law, but scared of it!

For reasons unknown (but probably related to his namesake vice), Tom Idle is back on land again. If he was callous enough to throw out his indenture leaving land, he certainly does not feel bound by any law on his return as he has gone so far as to turn highwayman (more likely footpad) and take up a (dismal) residence with "a common Prostitute".

In contrast to the luxury of Francis in plate 8, Thomas and his companion are shown living in complete squalor somewhere in London. The sole article of furniture in the room is the broken down bed that Tom and his woman are lying on. She is busy examining the various nonmonetary spoils from his thefts on the highway, including an earring that looks like a gallows. The bottles on the fireplace mantel are suggestive of venereal disease, similar to those of plate 3 in A Harlot's Progress.

The broken flute and bottle, together with the pair of breeches discarded on the bedclothes, suggest they have spent their time in drunken debauchery. Samuel Ireland suggests that he was doing this to drive away his fears of the law.

The principal event of the scene is a cat falling down the chimney with a few bricks (which strongly suggests the quality of the house they are lodging in), which causes Tom Idle to start up with all the fear of the law on him.

The extremely dilapidated condition of the building, lack of any obvious source of light or fire, and covering over of the window by a hoop petticoat suggest that Idle is in hiding and sparing no pains to keep his location a secret.

Leviticus CHAP:XXVI. Ve:30.
The Sound of a Shaken Leaf
shall Chace him.

=== Plate 8 — The Industrious 'Prentice grown rich, & Sheriff of London ===
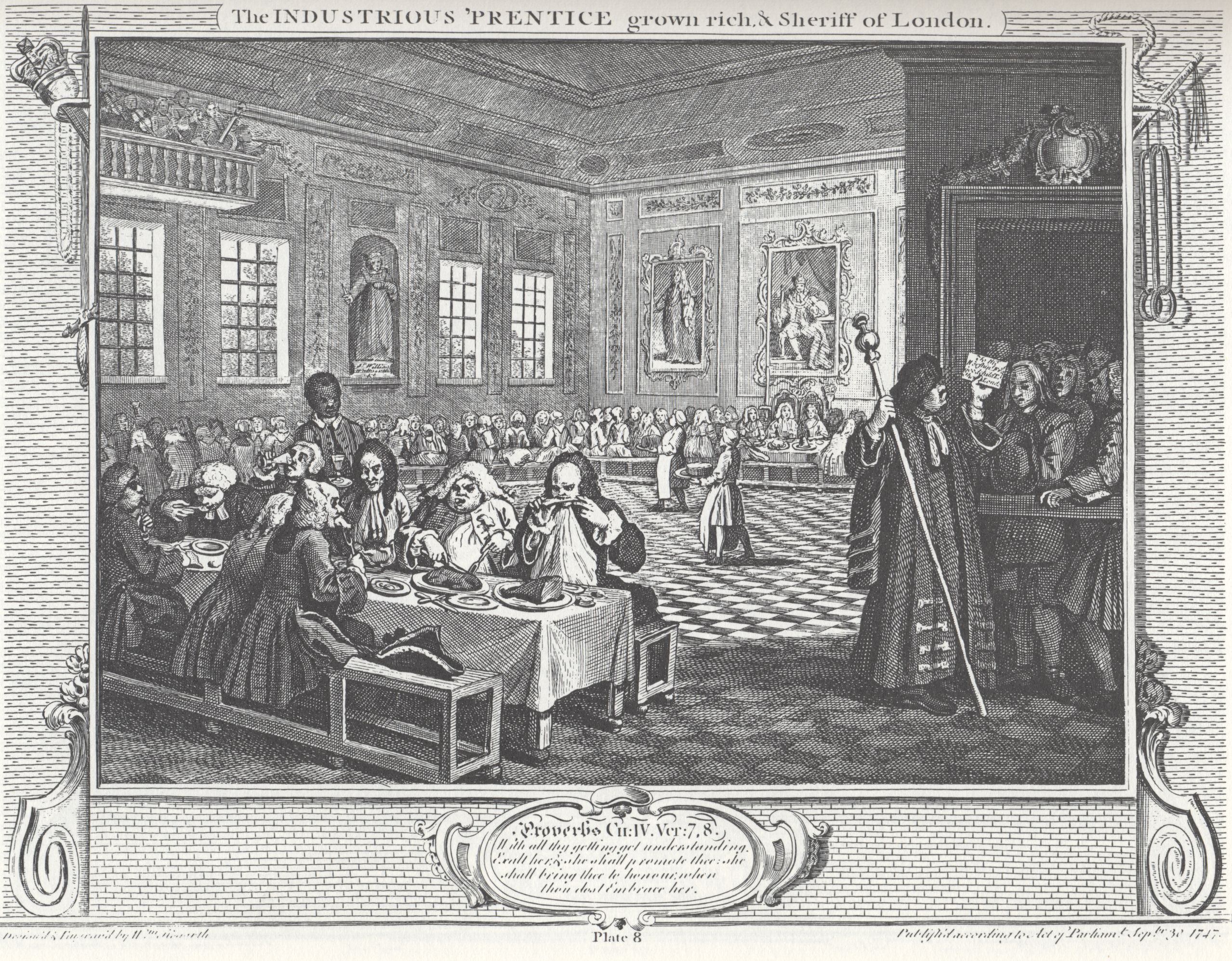
Only incidentally about the 'prentice

Plate 8 shows the opulence that industry has produced (or rather, allowed to be procured): the couple sit at the far end of the table (Just to the left of the man in the foreground with the staff) on chairs, apparently in state. His chair has the sword of state on its right arm and on her left the crowned mace.

A significant portion of this plate is taken up with a related satire of gluttony, which takes place in the left foreground. In particular, the two on the far right warn that even earned riches are as susceptible to squander and waste as any other.

To the upper left, an orchestra on a balcony provides musical accompaniment.

The chamberlain (the man with the staff of office) examines a paper addressed "To the worſhip^{l} Fra^{s} Goodchild E^{ſq} Sher[...] Lond" while a crowd of people mills at the bar. This is the first time we find out his first name.

Proverbs CH:IV. Ver:7, 8.
With all thy getting get understanding
Exalt her, & she shall promote thee: she
shall bring thee to honour, when
thou dost Embrace her

=== Plate 9 — The Idle 'Prentice betrayed (by his Whore), & taken in a Night-Cellar with his Accomplice ===
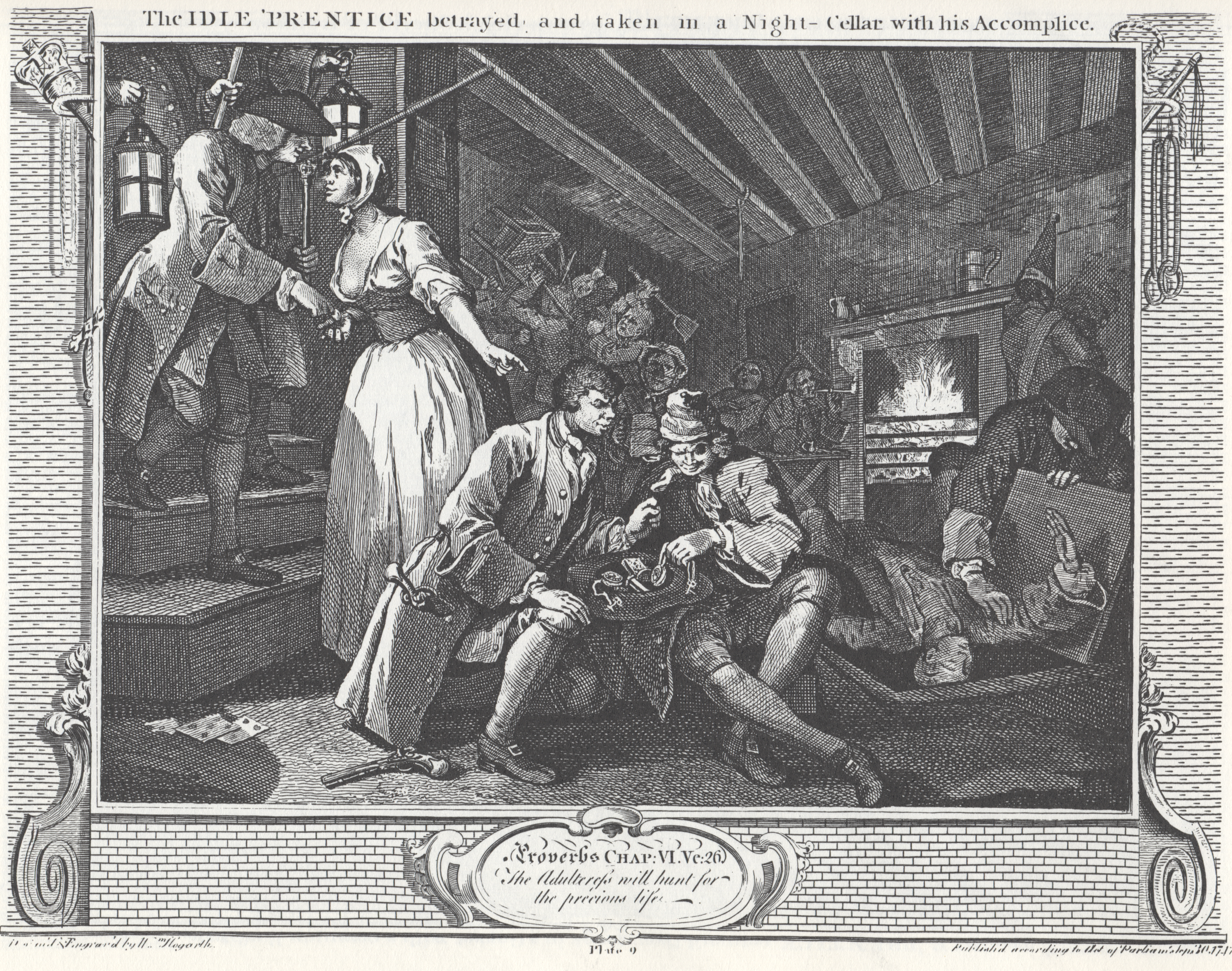
Red-Handed

Idle has now gone from highway robbery to out and out murder for petty gain. He is shown here examining the effects of the dead man in a hat (probably his) between them, while another man pitches the body down a trap door. They are all totally oblivious not only to the men of the Law coming down the stairs with lit lanterns, but Idle's prostitute being paid one coin for her information. Clearly, Idle is caught without any means of escape.

The background shows his most congenial surroundings to be the most lawless and depraved possible: playing cards are strewn in the left foreground, men are murdered with no hue and cry, a rope hangs ominously from one of the beams in the ceiling, a syphilitic woman with no nose serves a mug of something, presumably liquor and/or gin, and a massive drunken brawl occupies half of the room, while the others unconcernedly ignore it.

Proverbs CHAP:VI. Ve:26.
The Adultereſs will hunt for
the precious life

Note that in some versions the title is "The Idle 'Prentice betrayed by his Whore, & taken in a Night-Cellar with his Accomplice", whereas others remove "by his Whore".

=== Plate 10 – The Industrious 'Prentice Alderman of London, the Idle one brought before him & Impeach'd by his Accomplice ===
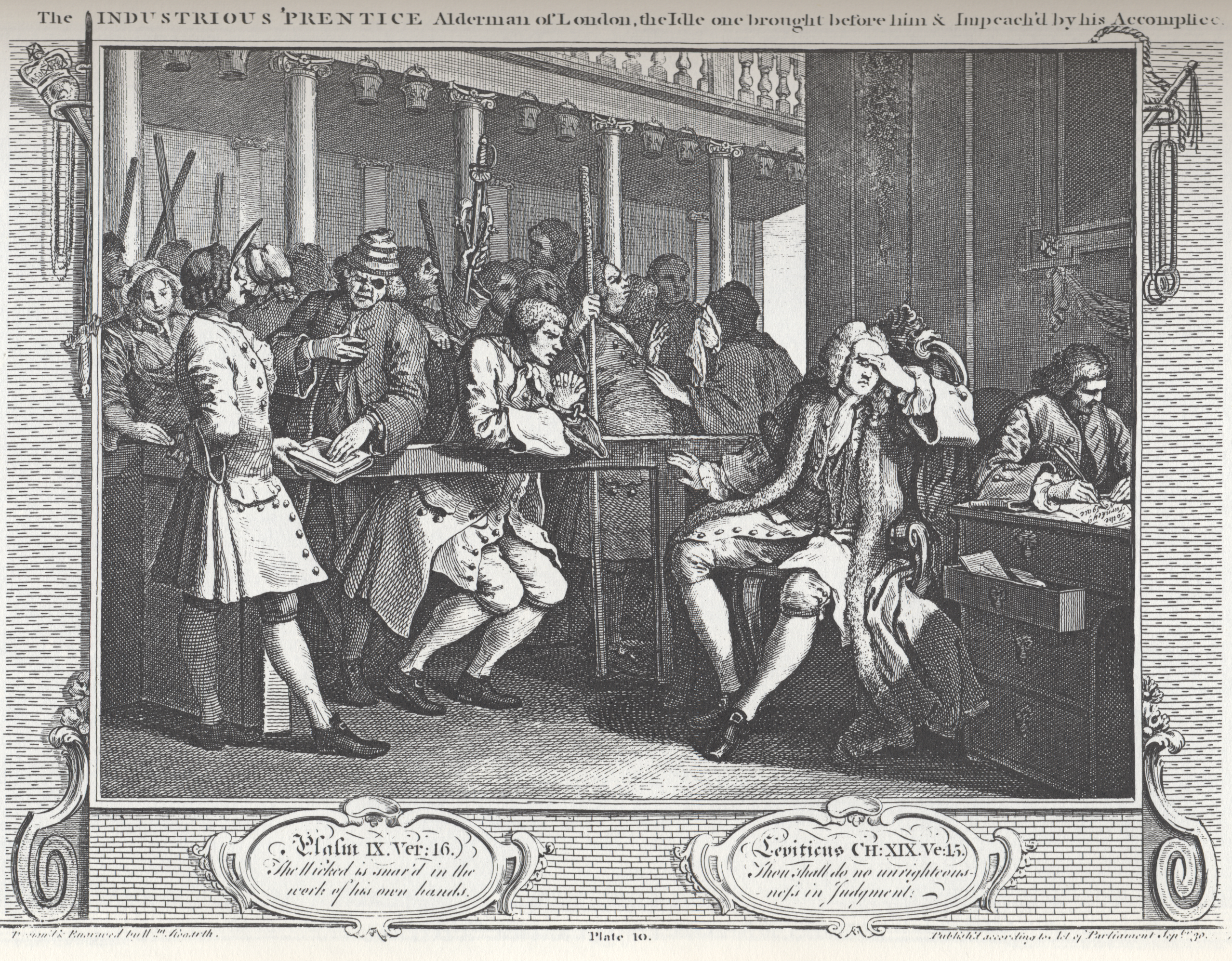
Ending on unequal footing

Having led their separate lives for four plates each, the two apprentices meet again, considerably further down their paths of life. Again, Tom is on the left, Francis, the right (the frame is reversed, so the rope, etc. is above Francis).

Idle is now completely lost: his accomplice readily turns King's evidence, a man behind him holds up the two pistols and sword used in the commission of the murder in one hand and points to Idle with the other, and he is being arraigned before his former fellow-apprentice, who remembers his earlier inclinations and could well imagine him turning footpad. While he turns away, either struggling with his feelings (as implied by the quote at the bottom of the frame) or disgustedly spurning his entreaties, the clerk next to him writes out the warrant of admission "To the Turnkey of Newgate".

To the right of Idle, his mother again tearfully pleads with an officer who dismisses her. The bailiff administering the oath has put his quill pen behind his ear facing forward, making him look ridiculous, so that he might take a bribe from the woman next to him, who is paying him to not notice that the oath he administers is being sworn with the wrong hand and hence worthless.

Fire buckets labelled "SA" hang from the balcony behind the crowd.

Pſalm IX. Ver:16.
The Wicked is snar'd in the
work of his own hands

Leviticus CH:XIX Ve:15.
Thou shall do no unrighteous-
-neſs in Judgement

=== Plate 11 — The Idle 'Prentice Executed at Tyburn ===
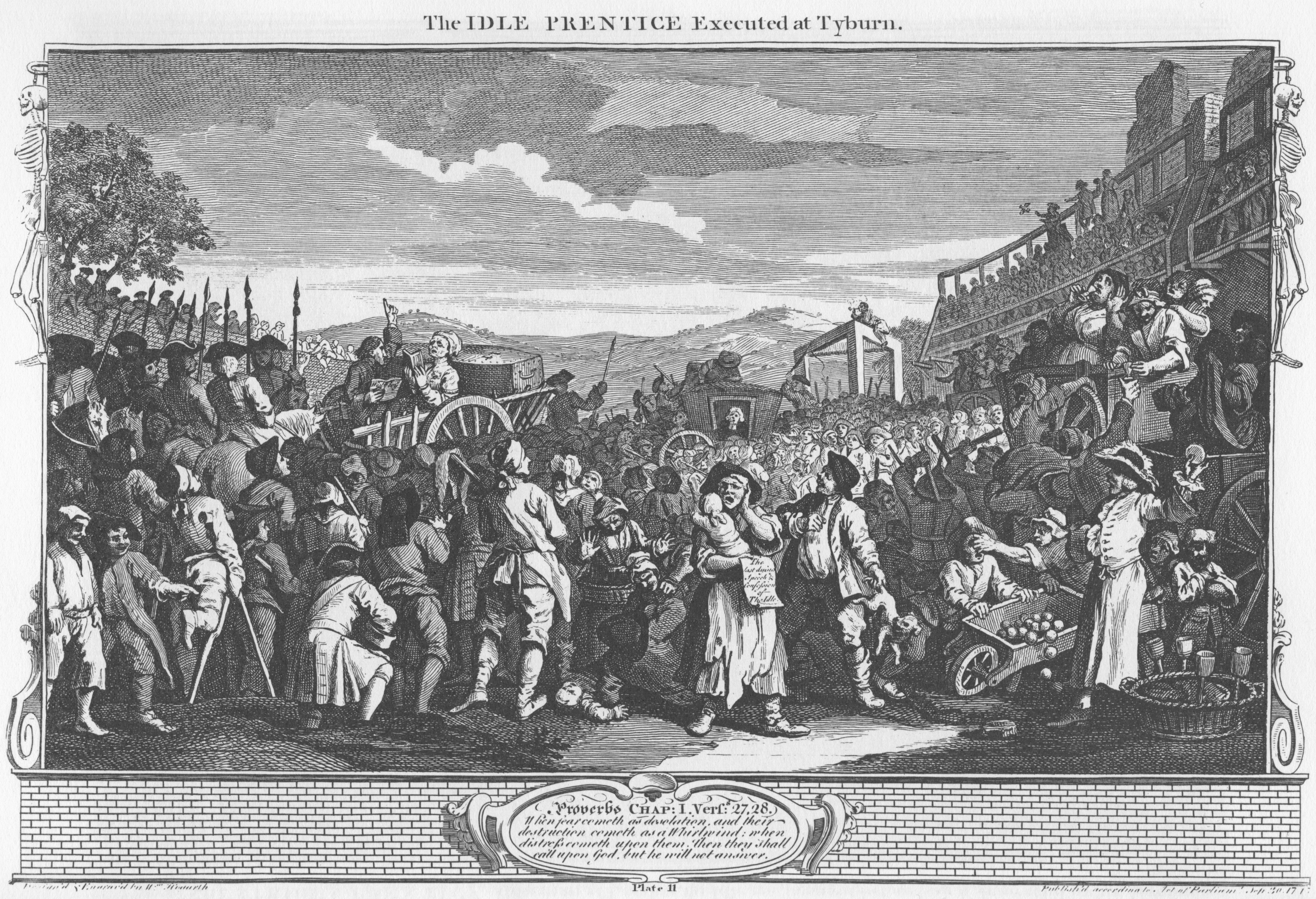
Idleness and immorality produce their just reward.

Idle now comes, like Tom Nero in The Four Stages of Cruelty, to the reward of his depredations and malice: a felon's death on the gallows.

The procession from left to right shows a detachment of soldiers riding behind the tumbrel, which contains a preacher with a book labelled Wesley, a reference to Methodism. The cleric vigorously discourses to a now hairless Thomas Idle, who is leaning on his own coffin (marked by the initials "T.I."). The coach ahead carries the Official clergyman (who will actually preside at the execution). Beyond looms the Tyburn Tree. The executioner lies unconcernedly along one of the crossbeams, smoking his pipe and apparently inured to the nature of his work.

In the right background, more or less well behaved spectators wait. One releases a pigeon that will fly back to Newgate and give the news that (by the time it has arrived) the malefactor is dead.

Around and in the midst of the semi-orderly procession, chaos reigns.

In the front center, a woman with a baby is advertising "The last dying Speech & Conſeſsion of—Tho. Idle." although the condemned has not yet arrived at the gallows. To the left, a brawl involves two to four people. To her left, a drunken sot attempts to court the woman with ridiculous airs, notwithstanding his holding a dog up by the tail. The suspended dog, positioned directly below the gibbet in the picture, prefigures another "cur" who is about to be hanged. Behind them a massive riot goes on while a woman assaults the man pushing over her cart of fruit. A man to the far right peddles something. In one corner are two boys, one pickpocketing and the other resisting temptation, possibly echoing Idle and Goodchild.

The frame of the picture shows Thomas' ultimate fate, hung on a gibbet for his highway collecting.

Finally, the verse at the bottom completes Idle's doom.

Proverbs CHAP I. Verſ:s 27, 28.
When fear cometh as desolation, and their
destruction cometh as a Whirlwind; when
distreſs cometh upon them, they shall
call upon God, but he will not answer

=== Plate 12 – The Industrious 'Prentice Lord-Mayor of London ===
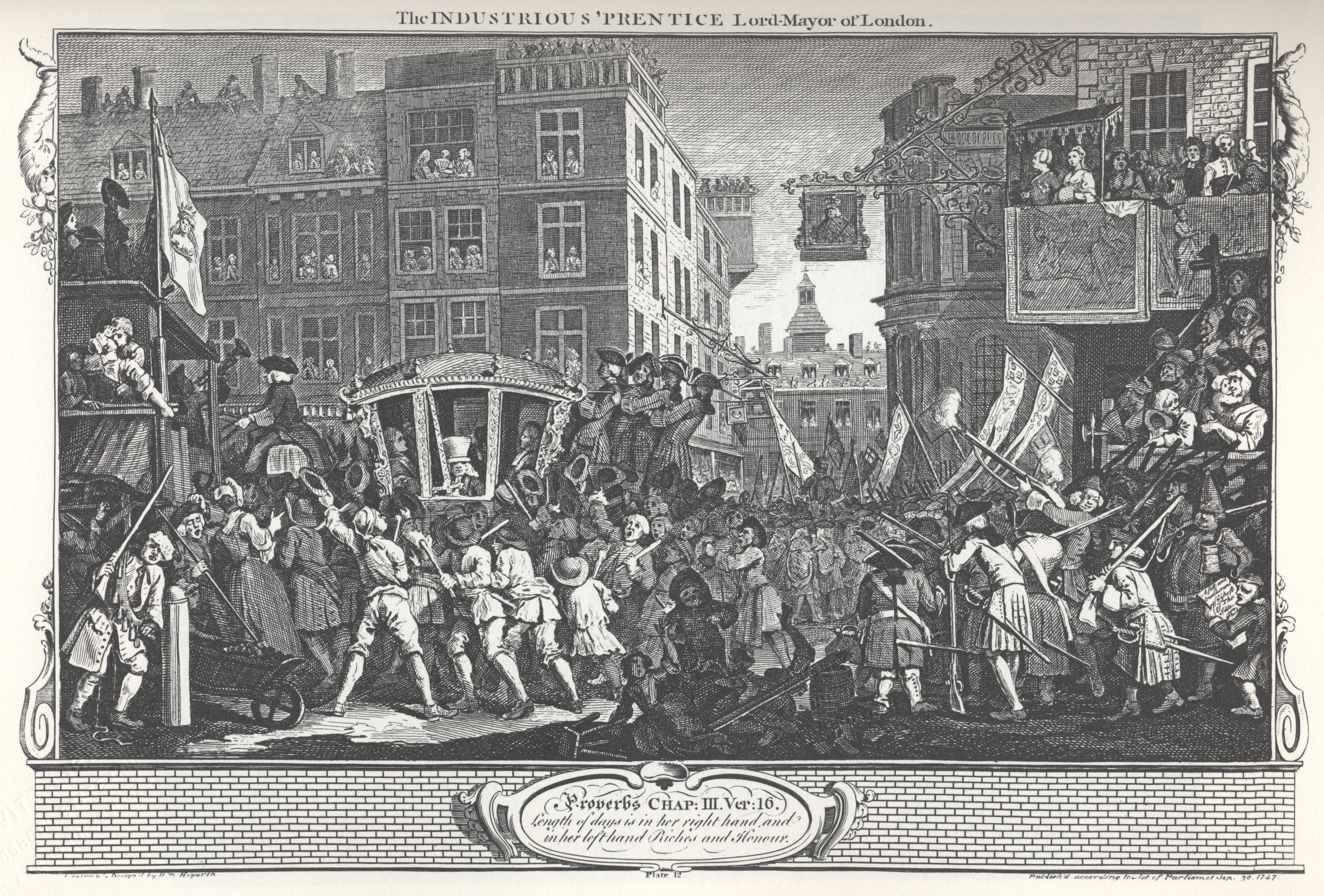
Fulfilling the constant foreshadowing

Now that the Idle 'Prentice met his reward, industry gets its turn: The industry and morality of Francis Goodchild result in his being chosen the Lord Mayor of the City.

He is here shown riding in the Lord Mayor's carriage, holding the sword of state and wearing an outsized top hat. From the balcony on the right, a genteel crowd observes his passing, as do people in all the windows fronting on the street.

Meanwhile, the crowd drunkenly near-riots around him. In the far lower right, a boy holding "A full and true Account of y^{e} Ghoſt of Tho Idle. Which […]" shows the final fate of Thomas Idle's memory: an entry in The Newgate Calendar. Nearby members of an escort of disorganised militia accidentally discharge their muskets or drink from mugs.

The frame is now surrounded by cornucopias, referring to the verse at the bottom:

Proverbs CHAP: III. Ver:16.
Length of days is in her right hand, and
in her left hand Riches and Honour

=== Unfinished parts ===
Hogarth sketched out at least three other scenes that never got made into engravings: one of the inside of Goodchild's place after his marriage (Presumably to go after or instead of 6) and a set of him giving money to his parents while Idle swipes a tankard of his mother's (Meant to follow 7).

== See also ==
- List of works by William Hogarth
