= Wound Man =

Illustrated, annotated diagram of the human body

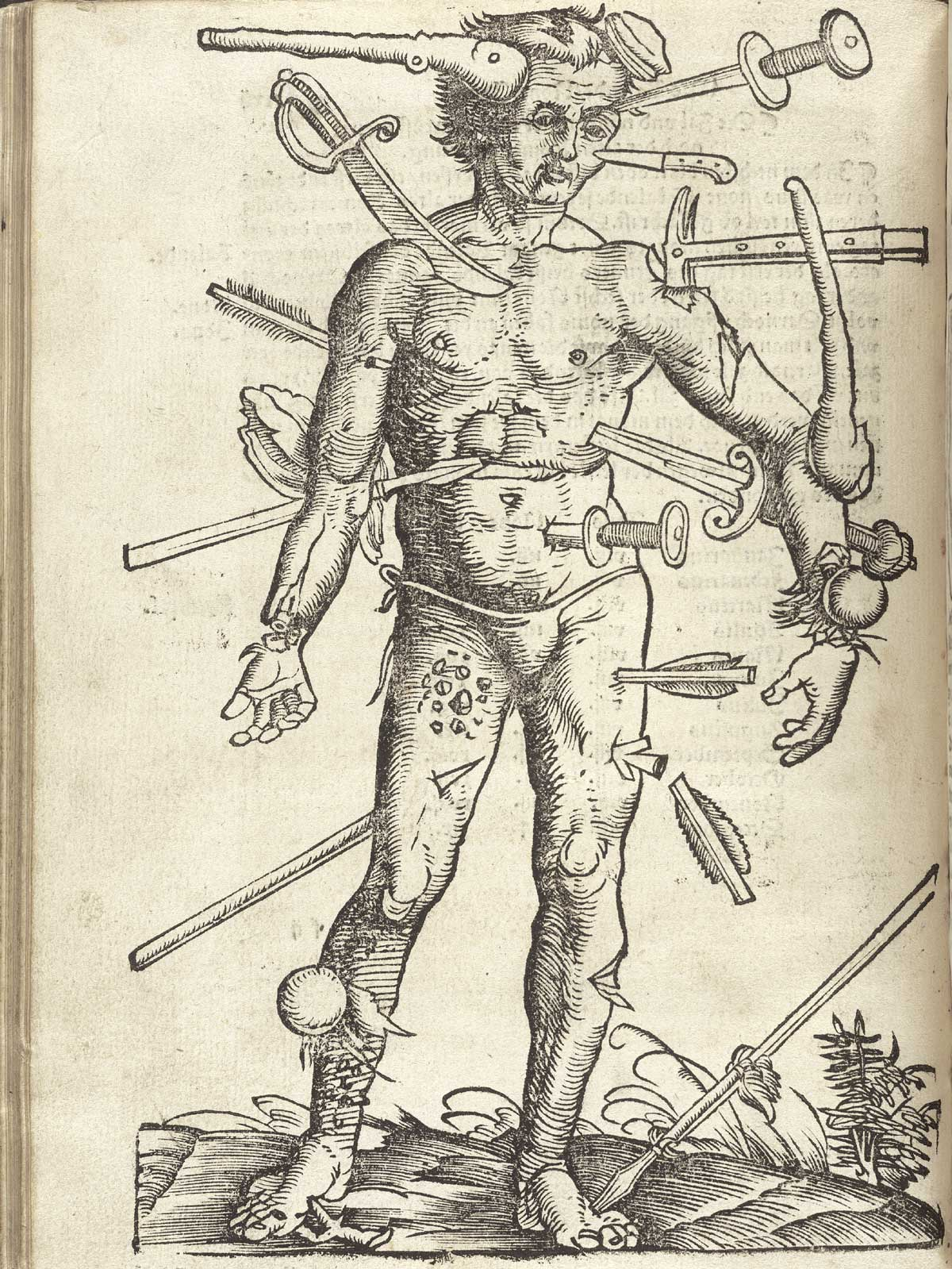
Wound Man from Hans von Gersdorff's Feldtbuch der Wundartzney (Strasburg, 1519).

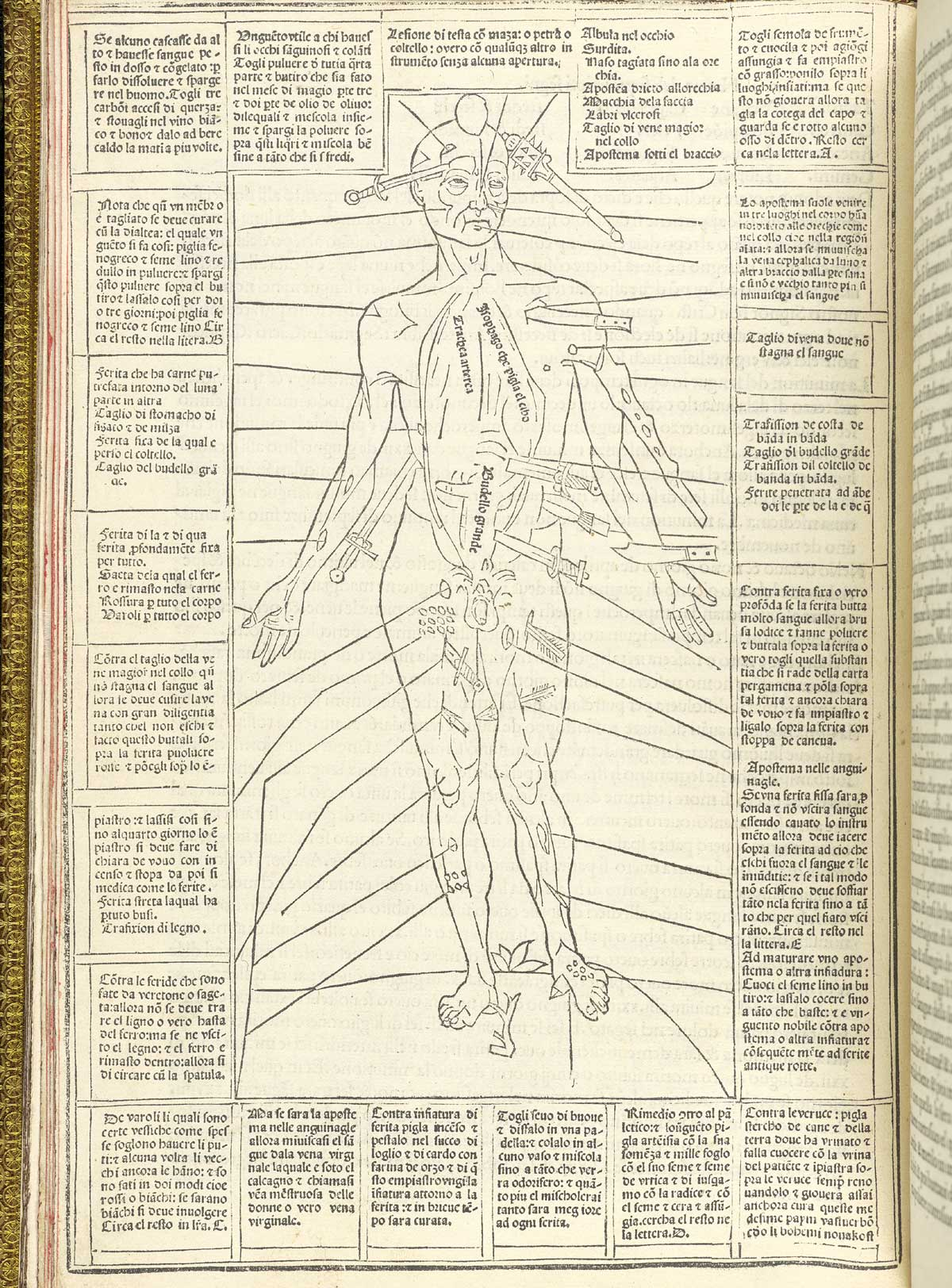
Wound Man from the Fasiculo de Medicina (Venice, 1495).

The Wound Man is a surgical diagram which first appeared in European medical manuscripts of the fourteenth and fifteenth centuries. The illustration acted as an annotated table of contents to guide the reader through various injuries and diseases whose related cures could be found on the text's nearby pages. The image first appeared in a printed book in 1491 when it was included in the Venetian Fasciculus medicinae, likely Europe's first printed medical miscellany. Thereafter it circulated widely in printed books until well into the seventeenth century. The Wound Man has since become a recognisable figure in popular culture.

== Description ==
The Wound Man illustrates various injuries that a person might receive through war, accident, or disease: cuts and bruises from multiple weapons, rashes and pustules, thorn scratches, and the bites of venomous animals. The figure also includes some schematic anatomical outlines of several organs within his unusual, transparent abdomen.

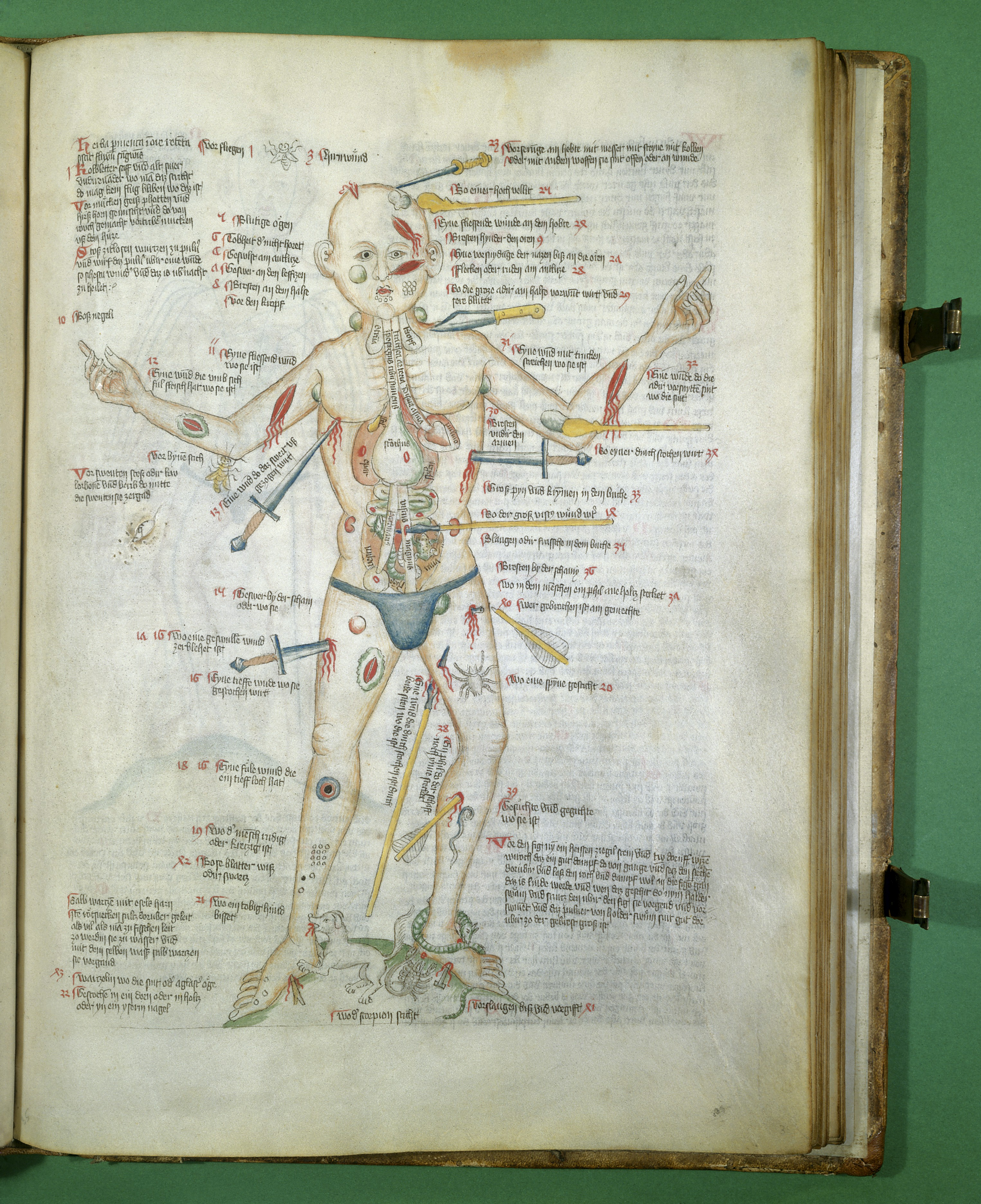
The Wound Man from a manuscript made in Germany probably around 1420 (London, Wellcome Library MS 49)

In earlier manuscript versions, the figure is surrounded by numbers and phrases which indicate where in the accompanying treatise a healer might find a particular helpful procedure. For instance, in a German Wound Man now in the Wellcome Library, London (MS 49), the spider crawling up the man's thigh is labelled "Wo eine spynne gesticht, 20" ("When a spider bites, 20"), directing the reader to paragraph 20 of the book for an appropriate cure. Similarly, written along the large spear piercing the figure's left side and penetrating into his stomach is the legend "So der gross viscus wund wirt, 14" ("If the large intestine is injured, 14"). Turning to the corresponding cure number 14, the reader finds:

14. Item: If the groze darm [large intestine] or the magen [stomach] or the gederme [entrails] are injured, you can heal it thus: sew it together with a fine thread and sprinkle rot puluer [red powder] on it. The same powder is good for all wounds, and the best can be made thus. Take 9 parts of swartz win [black wine] that is the very reddest and 1 lot of hematite, 1 lot each of nutmeg and white frankincense, 3 lots of gum arabic, 1 lot each of sanguinem draconis [dragon’s blood, sap from the Dracaena cinnabari tree] and mumie [mummy]. Pound that all together, make a powder out of it, and keep it as needed.

Despite these injuries, however, the Wound Man is still depicted as standing defiantly alive. This reaffirms the fact that the figure was not intended as a threatening one: instead it explained and glorified the cures and medical treatments available in the texts that he accompanied.

== In popular culture ==
The Wound Man continues to be referenced in popular culture:

The constant invocation of the wound man in surgical treatises for over 300 years shows the capacity of this image instantly to bring the reader into the gruesome yet serious space of the surgical professional. But it also speaks to the ability of the wound man to capture the attention of any reader who stumbled across him. As his recent reappearance in the NBC TV series Hannibal suggests, the morbid wonder he encapsulates still holds true for viewers today.

Wound Man is referenced in season 1, episode 6 and season 2, episode 7, of Hannibal, which is based on the novels Red Dragon and Hannibal – which also reference Wound Man.

The Royal College of Emergency Medicine uses a Wound Man as a supporter in its heraldic achievement.
