= Fasciculus Medicinae =

1491 medical handbook

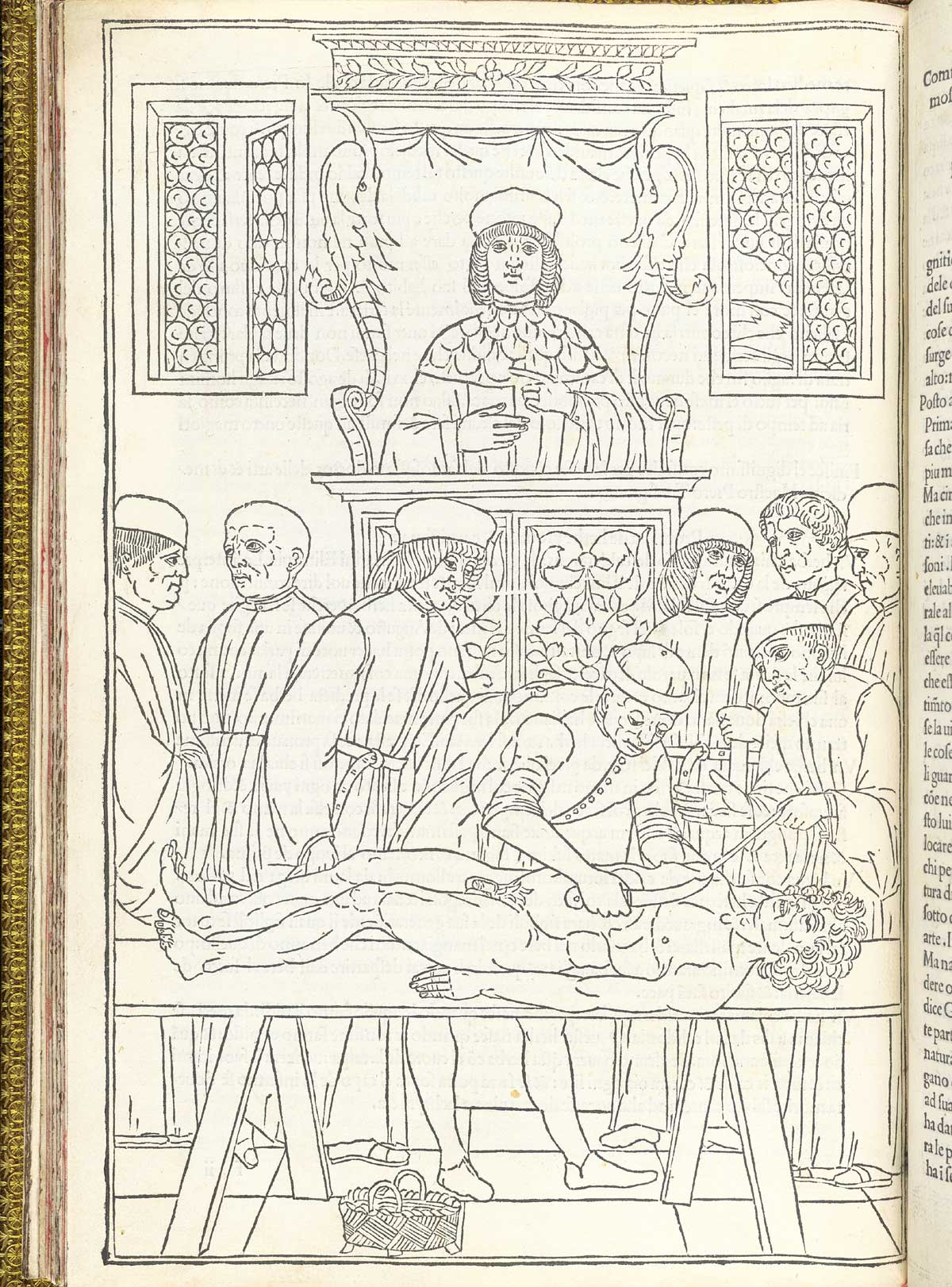
Dissection scene from Fasiculo de Medicina (Venice, 1493/95 edition).

Fasciculus Medicinae is a "bundle" of medieval medical treatises first printed in Latin in Venice in 1491 by the brothers Giovanni and Gregorio de Gregori. The collection, which existed only in two manuscripts (handwritten copies) prior to printing, was edited by Giorgio dal Monferrato and came out in numerous editions over the next 30 years. Johannes de Ketham, the name attached to the collection in its colophon, was neither the author nor the original compiler; his identity remains unresolved. Karl Sudhoff argued he was "Johannes von Kircheim," a medical professor at the University of Vienna active 1455–1470, though more recent research by Christian Coppens has cast doubt on this identification.

The topics of the treatises cover a wide spectrum of medieval European medical knowledge and technique, including uroscopy, astrology, bloodletting, the treatment of wounds, plague, anatomical dissection, and women’s health. The book is remarkable as one of the first illustrated medical works to appear in print. The original 1491 edition included a urine chart, a diagram of the veins for phlebotomy, Zodiac Man, a pregnant woman, Wound Man, and Disease Man — five full-figure images that had already circulated together in manuscript for decades before appearing in print.

In 1493 (1494 by modern reckoning), the Gregori brothers issued an Italian translation, Fasiculo de Medicina, edited by Sebastiano Manilio. This edition redrew five of the original images in a more classicizing style, reflecting the influence of Venetian artists such as Giovanni Bellini and Andrea Mantegna, and added four new full-page illustrations: a frontispiece depicting a scholar identified as "Petrus de Montagnana"; a urine-consultation scene; a plague-consultation scene illustrating a treatise by Pietro da Tossignano (fl. 1364–1401); and a dissection scene prefacing the Anothomia Mundini, a 1316 anatomical treatise by Mondino dei Liuzzi of the University of Bologna.

The dissection woodcut is regarded as the earliest printed depiction of human dissection and one of only a handful of pre-1500 images of the practice. The ten full-page woodcut illustrations of this expanded edition influenced artists for some time – even as late as 1751, when the last of William Hogarth's Four Stages of Cruelty is thought to borrow from the dissection scene (above).

Later editions show individual variation: a surviving 1495 copy has hand-drawn coverings added over the male figures' genitals, likely by a later owner; an edition of 1500 adds a treatise on children's diseases by Rhazes; a 1509 Milan printing used mirror-reversed woodblocks; and the last known edition appeared in 1522, aside from a single seventeenth-century reprint. By then the work's medical content had become outdated and was soon superseded by newer anatomical works, notably Andreas Vesalius's De humani corporis fabrica (1543).
