= James Field (criminal) =

Irish boxer

- Born: c.1714 Dublin, Ireland
- Died: 11 February 1751; London, England
- Occupation(s): Boxer, sailor, criminal

James Field (c.1714 – 11 February 1751) was a sailor and boxer in England in the 18th century who was hanged for robbery.

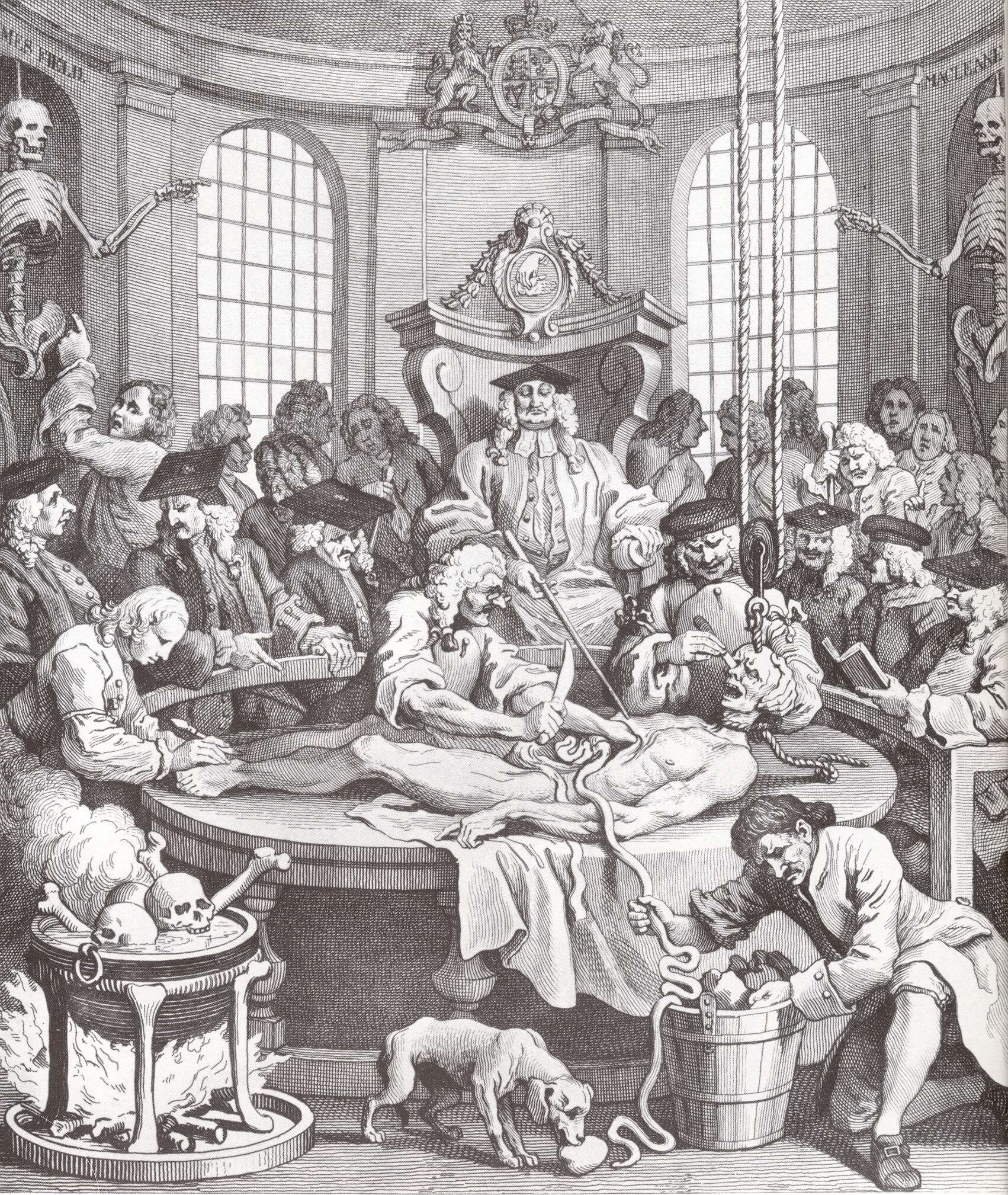
The reward of cruelty (Plate IV)

He was born in Dublin, and spent most of his early life involved in petty crime. His criminal record meant that in Ireland he spent most of his time on the run, so he moved to London. There he continued his life of crime, becoming well known in the underworld. Wanted for various robberies, he avoided capture by going to sea, working as a sailor on merchantmen and as a privateer. When he returned in London, he became renowned as a boxer. He lived and worked at a pub called The Fox in Drury Lane. He returned to Ireland briefly when things became too hot for him in London, but returned soon afterwards. Although there were several warrants for his arrest, the constables were afraid of him, and rather than acting on the warrants when they saw him, they would pretend not to recognize him and pass by.

He was eventually surprised at The Fox, overwhelmed, and arrested for theft with violence and highway robbery. He was tried before Henry Fielding on 16 January 1751. He and three other men were accused of beating and robbing a man and his wife on 24 May 1750 and, despite a number of witnesses supplying Field with various alibis, he was recognized by his size and bulk. James Eklin, who had been a member of the group who had committed the crime, gave evidence against Field. Field was found guilty and Fielding sentenced him to death. He was hanged at Tyburn on 11 February 1751, aged 37.

His skeleton features in the dissection theatre in William Hogarth's Reward of Cruelty, one of the series The Four Stages of Cruelty. Field's name makes an earlier appearance in the series of prints, in Second Stage of Cruelty a poster announcing a boxing match features his name.
