= Johannes de Ketham =

German physician

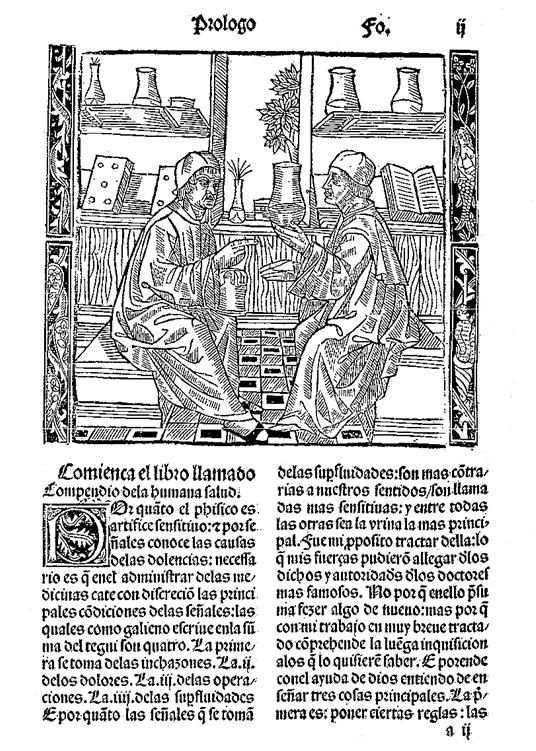
Frontispiece: "Compendio de la humana salud". Pamplona: Arnao Guillén de Brocar; 10/10/1495.

Johannes de Ketham was a German physician living in Italy at the end of the fifteenth century. Little is known about him, but he has been identified by many as a physician practicing in Vienna in 1460 named Johannes von Kirchheim.

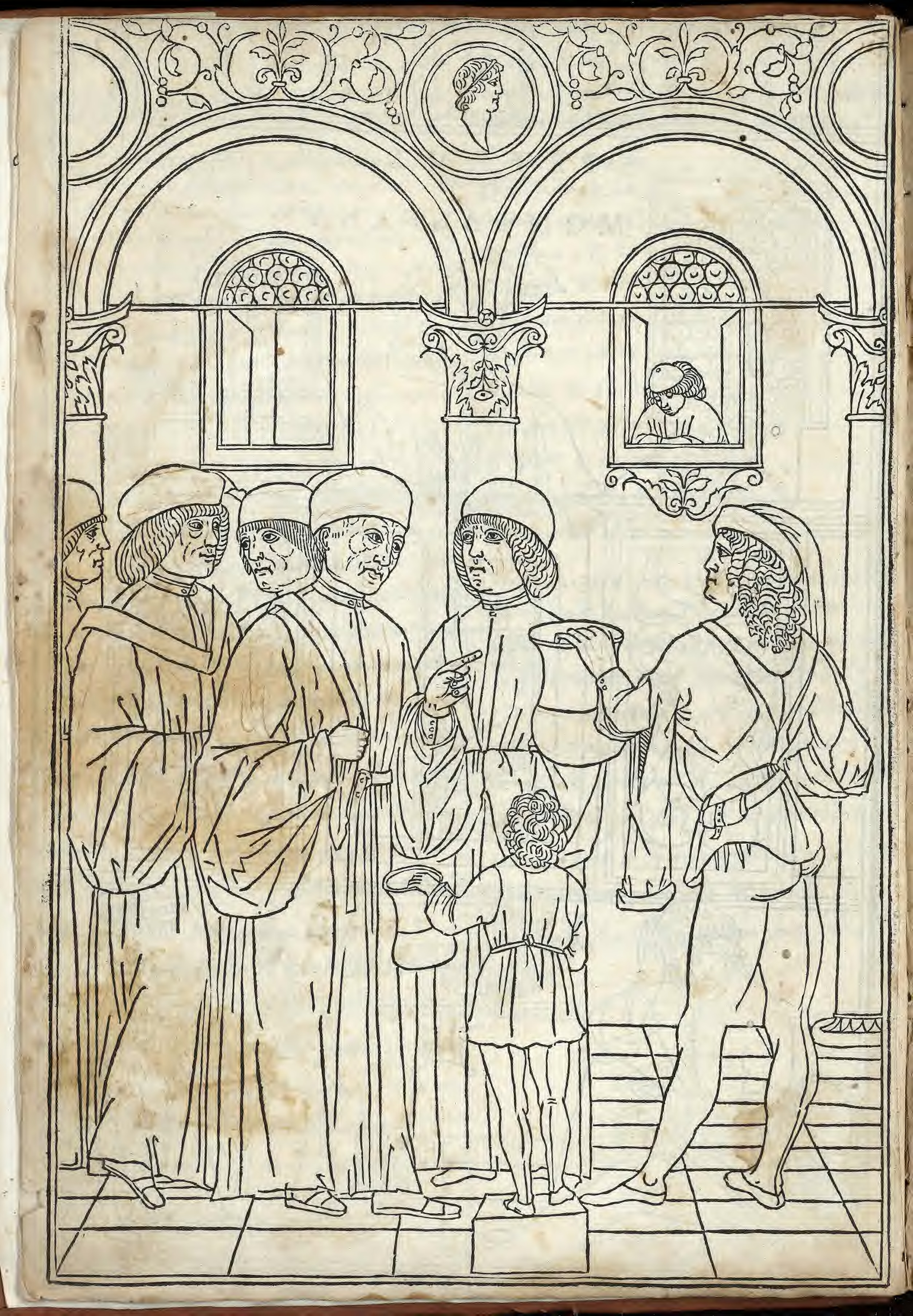
Fasciculus medicinae, 1493

Ketham is known today for producing the monumental Fasciculus Medicinae, which was first published in Venice in 1491. Fasciculus medicinae was the first printed book to contain anatomical illustrations. The text is a collection of short medical treatises edited by Ketham, many of which are from the medieval period.
