= Van der Burg =

Van der Burg is a Dutch toponymic surname meaning "from the fortress / stronghold". Variations are Van de Burg, Van den Burg, Van den Burgh and Van der Burgh. Anglicized versions of these names show a variety of agglutinations and capitalizations. Notable people with the surname include:

Van der Burg / Vanderburg

- Adriaan van der Burg (1693–1733), Dutch painter
- Agnes Vanderburg (1901–1989), Native American (Salish) translator and writer
- Ben van der Burg (born 1968), Dutch speed skater
- Brigitte van der Burg (born 1961), Dutch politician
- Dave van der Burg (born 1993), Dutch off-road bicycle racer
- Dirk van der Burg (1721–1773), Dutch landscape painter and watercolorist
- Eric van der Burg (born 1965), Dutch politician
- George VanderBurg (born 1957), Canadian politician
- Helen Vanderburg (born 1959), Canadian synchronized swimmer
- Johan van der Burg (died 1640), Dutch Governor of Formosa
- Joost van der Burg (born 1993), Dutch track cyclist
- Willem H. Vanderburg (born 1944), Dutch-born Canadian technologist and writer

Van Deburg

- William L. Van Deburg (born 1948), American professor of Afro-American Studies

Van den Burg / Vandenburg

- Hans Vandenburg (born 1946), Dutch pop musician
- Herman Vandenburg Ames (1865–1935), American legal historian and documentary preservationist
- Ieke van den Burg (1952–2014), Dutch politician
- Malcolm VandenBurg (born c.1950), English physician

Van den Burgh / Vandenburgh

- G. van den Burgh (fl. 1938), Netherlands Indies footballer
- Jane Vandenburgh (born 1948), American writer
- John Van Denburgh (1872–1924), American herpetologist
- Shelli VanDenburgh (born 1969), American politician

Van der Burgh / Vanderburgh

- Cameron van der Burgh (born 1988), South African swimmer
- Charles E. Vanderburgh (1829–1898), American jurist
- Federal Vanderburgh (1788–1868), American physician and homeopath
- Hendrick van der Burgh (1627–aft.1664), Dutch genre painter
- Henry Vanderburgh (1760–1812), Indiana Territory judge, namesake of Vanderburgh County, Indiana
- Pieter Daniel van der Burgh (1805–1879), Dutch landscape painter
- Stephen Vanderburgh Harkness (1818–1868), American businessman

== See also ==
- Van der Burgh, Dutch surname
- Van den Berg, Dutch surname
- Vandenberg (surname), concatenated form of Dutch surname
