= Van den Berg =

Van den Berg (Dutch pronunciation: [vɑn dən ˈbɛrx]) is a Dutch-language topographic surname meaning "of/from the mountain/slope". With 58,562 people carrying the name, it was the fourth most common surname in The Netherlands in 2007. Variants are Van de Berg, Van der Berg, Van den Berge. Van den Bergh, Van den Berghe and Van den Berghen. Anglicised forms are generally agglutinated and variably capitalized, e.g. "Vandenberg". The abbreviated form is "v.d. Berg" (i.e. Rudolf v.d. Berg). People with the surname include:

== Van den Berg ==
- Ad van den Berg (1944–2023), Dutch politician who advocated legalizing pedophilia
- Adrianus van den Berg (born 1954), Dutch rock guitarist
- Albert Van den Berg (resistant) (1890–1945), saved hundreds of Jews
- Albert van den Berg (physicist) (born 1957), Dutch physicist
- Albert van den Berg (rugby union) (born 1976), South African rugby player
- Albert Jan van den Berg (born 1949), Dutch jurist
- Aldo van den Berg (born 1978), South African cricketer
- Bart van den Berg (born 1993), Dutch tennis player
- Carel van den Berg (1924–1971), Dutch chess master
- Cássio van den Berg (born 1971), Brazilian botanist
- Charl Van Den Berg (1981–2015), South African model and LGBT activist
- Daniël van den Berg, Dutch politician
- Daniella van den Berg (born 1996), Aruban swimmer
- Desirée van den Berg (born 1987), Dutch model
- Dirk van den Berg (born 1966), German film director and producer
- Eja Siepman van den Berg (born 1943), Dutch sculptor
- Floris van den Berg (born 1973) Dutch philosopher, author, Director of CFI Low Countries
- Gerard van den Berg (1932–2009), Dutch TV show host
- Gerard J. van den Berg (born 1962), Dutch econometrician
- Gert van den Berg (cyclist) (1903–?), Dutch racing cyclist
- Gert van den Berg (politician) (1935–2024), Dutch SGP politician
- Gillian van den Berg (born 1971), Dutch water polo player
- Guido van den Berg (1975–2019), German politician
- Han van den Berg (1925–2015), Dutch rower
- Harman van den Berg (1918–2006), South African football midfielder
- Helma van den Berg (1965–2003), Dutch linguist of Caucasian languages
- Hugo van den Berg (born 1990), Dutch Grand Prix motorcycle racer
- Jack van den Berg (born 1959), Dutch football coach
- Jacq van den Berg (1916–?), Dutch competitive sailor
- Jan van den Bergh (painter) (1587–1660), Dutch painter
- Jan van den Berg (footballer) (1879–1951), Dutch footballer
- Jan Hendrik van den Berg (1914–2012), Dutch psychologist
- Janwillem van den Berg (1920–1985), Dutch speech scientist
- Jeen van den Berg (1928–2014), Dutch speed skater, winner of the Elfstedentocht in 1954
- Joba van den Berg (born 1958), Dutch politician
- Joël van den Berg (born 2007), Dutch footballer
- Joey van den Berg (born 1986), Dutch football midfielder
- Johannes van den Berg (born 1946) Dutch Musician better known as Harry Vanda
- Jordan van den Berg (born 2002), South African football player
- Julius van den Berg (born 1996), Dutch cyclist
- Ko van den Berg (born 1950), Dutch competitive sailor
- Laura van den Berg (born 1983), American novelist
- Lodewijk van den Berg (1932–2022), Dutch-born American chemical engineer and astronaut
- Lodewijk Willem Christiaan van den Berg (1845–1927), Dutch scholar
- Luciano van den Berg (1984–2005), Dutch football defender
- Mandy van den Berg (born 1990), Dutch football defender
- Marco van den Berg (born 1965), Dutch basketball coach
- Max van den Berg (born 1956), Dutch politician, Labour Party chairman from 1999 to 2007
- Mien van den Berg (1909–1996), Dutch gymnast
- Morné van den Berg (born 1997), South African rugby player
- Nick van den Berg (born 1980), Dutch pool player
- Niekie van den Berg, South African politician and talk radio host
- Paul van den Berg (born 1936), Belgian football midfielder
- Peter van den Berg (born 1971), Dutch football defender and coach
- Quinten van den Berg (born 1985), Dutch DJ and Musical Producer known as Quintino
- Roy van den Berg (born 1988), Dutch track cyclist
- Rudolf van den Berg (1949–2025), Dutch writer and director
- Sepp van den Berg (born 2001), Dutch footballer
- Sjef van den Berg (born 1995), Dutch competitive archer
- Stephan van den Berg (born 1962), Dutch windsurfer, first gold medalist in Olympic windsurfing
- Trudy van den Berg (born 1947), Dutch pop singer
- Ulrich van den Berg (born 1975), South African golfer
- Vincent van den Berg (born 1989), Dutch football forward
- Willem van den Berg (1910–1987), Dutch fencer
- Wilma van den Berg (born 1947), Dutch sprinter

== Van de Berg ==
- Ed Vande Berg (born 1958), American baseball player
- Jeff Vandeberg, Dutch born American architect
- Linda van de Berg, Dutch track racing cyclist
- Tim van de Berg (born 1997), Dutch football midfielder

== Van der Berg ==
- Dirk van der Berg (born 1967), South African cricketer
- Hayes van der Berg (born 1994), South African cricketer

== Van den Berge ==
- Jojanneke van den Berge (born 1980), Dutch journalist
- Niels van den Berge (born 1984), Dutch GreenLeft politician
- Rinus van den Berge (1900–1972), Dutch sprinter
- Wim van den Berge (1905–1987), Dutch politician

== Other uses ==
- Hendrik J. and Wilhelmina H. Van Den Berg Cottage, listed on the National Register of Historic Places in Marion County, Iowa

== See also ==
- Van den Heuvel, similar Dutch surname meaning "of/from the hill"
- Van der Burg, Dutch surname sounding similar in English pronunciation, meaning "from the fortress"
