= Van den Burgh =

Van Den Burgh is a Dutch surname, meaning of the village. Not to be confused with van den Berg meaning of the mountain. It may refer to:

- G. Van Den Burgh, Indonesian footballer
- Jane Van Den Burgh (born 1948), American writer
- John Van Den Burgh (1872 - 1924), American herpetologist
- Shelli Van Den Burgh (born 1969), American politician
- Zeke Vandenburgh (born 1999), American football player
