= Van den Bergh =

Van den Bergh, Van Den Bergh is a Dutch surname, a variant of Van den Berg. Notable people with the surname include:

- Arnold van den Bergh (notary) (1886‒1950), Amsterdam civil law notary
- Dave van den Bergh (born 1976), Dutch footballer
- Dimitri Van den Bergh (born 1994), Belgian darts player
- Frans Van den Bergh (1914–1990), Belgian businessman
- Freddie van den Bergh (born 1992), English cricketer
- Frederik van den Bergh (1559–1618), Dutch soldier
- George van den Bergh (1890–1966), Dutch lawyer and astronomer
- Gert Van den Bergh (1920–1968), South African actor
- Gertrude van den Bergh (c. 1793 – 1840), Dutch classical pianist and composer
- Gustaaf Adolf van den Bergh van Eysinga (1874–1957), Dutch theologian
- Hendrik van den Bergh (count) (1573–1638), Dutch noble and soldier
- Hendrik van den Bergh (police official) (1914–1997), South African police official
- Henri W.PH.E. van den Bergh van Eysinga (1868–1920), Dutch writer and activist
- Herman van den Bergh (1558–1611), Dutch stadtholder
- Hijmans van den Bergh (1869–1943), Dutch physician
  - Van den Bergh reaction, chemical reaction
- Johannes van den Bergh (born 1986), German footballer
- Lode Van Den Bergh (1920–2020), Belgian writer
- Maarten van den Bergh (born 1942), Dutch businessman
- Matthias Jansz van den Bergh (1618–1687), Dutch Golden Age painter
- Michel Van den Bergh (born 1960), Belgian mathematician and academic
- Regardt van den Bergh, South African actor and film director
- Ricky van den Bergh (born 1980), Dutch footballer
- Samuel van den Bergh (1864–1941), Dutch businessman
- Sidney van den Bergh (born 1929), Canadian astronomer
- Sidney J. van den Bergh (1898–1977), Dutch businessman, military officer and politician
- Simon van den Bergh (1819–1907), Dutch businessman
- Solko van den Bergh (1854–1916), Dutch sport shooter
- Willem IV van den Bergh (1537–1586), Dutch stadtholder

== See also ==
- Van den Berg
- Vandenbergh
- Land van den Bergh, Dutch lordship
- Museum Mayer van den Bergh, museum in Antwerp, Belgium
- Van den Bergh catalogue, the VdB catalogue of reflection nebulae
- Van den Bergh (crater), lunar crater
- 4230 van den Bergh outer main-belt asteroid
