= Stray Kat Gallery =

Contemporary art gallery

Coordinates: 40.743115°N 74.007240°W

- Company type: Art gallery
- Founded: 2012 (14 years ago)
- Headquarters: Cooper Union, New York, New York

Stray Kat Gallery is a contemporary art gallery owned and directed by Kat Dahl, Zane Fix, and Stella Michaels.

In May 2012, Stray Kat Gallery made its debut at 88 Tenth Avenue as the only art gallery in New York's Chelsea Market, underneath the High Line Park. The success of the gallery's first exhibition in the 4,000-square-foot space led to a year-long run in the Chelsea Market.

On November 21, 2013, Stray Kat Gallery opened as the pioneers of the Meatpacking District, in an abandoned auto detailing garage, underneath the High Line Park. Art gallery openings, concerts, including Rob Fusari, former Lady Gaga producer, and fashion shows were on constant rotation. As always, the works of SKG's star artists, Stella Michaels, and Zane Fix, were showcased monthly, as featured guest artists were chosen for rotational exhibits.

In June 2014, Stray Kat's voyage continued into an 8,000-square-foot space at 450 W. 14th St. Featuring the works of Ms. Michaels and Mr. Fix, the gallery kept a steady flow of concurrent exhibitions, including a wide variety of painters, printmakers and photographers. An exclusive article with Interview magazine was published on July 22, 2014. On September 18, 2014, a private launch party was held for publisher Lee Herandez.
