= Gerard van den Berg =

Gerard van den Berg may refer to:

- Gerard van den Berg (television presenter) (1932–2009), Dutch radio and television presenter
- Gerard J. van den Berg (born 1962), Dutch econometrician
- Gerard van den Bergh (1882–1949), Dutch sports shooter
