= Van der Burgh =

van der Burgh is a surname. Notable people with the surname include:

- Cameron van der Burgh (born 1988), South African swimmer
- Hendrick van der Burgh (1627–1664), Dutch painter
- Pieter Daniel van der Burgh (1805–1879), Dutch painter

== See also ==
- Van der Burg
