= Loughborough Students' Union =

- Motto: Delivering an Unrivaled Student Experience
- Institution: Loughborough University, Loughborough College, RNIB College Loughborough
- Location: Ashby Road, Loughborough, Leicestershire, UK
- Established: 1975
- President: Mia Jackson
- Affiliations: BUCS
- Union Director: Elizabeth Monk
- Website: www.lsu.co.uk

Loughborough Students' Union (otherwise known as LSU) is the students' union serving members from Loughborough University, Loughborough College and the RNIB College Loughborough.

The Union was unique amongst British universities, in that its premises were owned by the students themselves. In 2022, the Union was purchased by the University. The union building sits in the North-Eastern corner of the campus, and consists of two floors. The Union is managed on a day-to-day basis by the Executive, with scrutiny from the Democracy and Representation Committee.

== History ==
The union has somewhat unusual origins. Dr Hebert Schofield (q.v.), Principal of Loughborough College from 1915 to 1950, was closely associated with the Students’ Association, even serving as its president despite being the College Principal. He was far-seeing and accumulated land to the East of Loughborough for the college. However, when he could not persuade Leicestershire County Council to pay for the land, he used student monies. Thus, land became vested in the name of the Union of Loughborough Colleges.

In the early 1970s, the Union of Loughborough Colleges was relatively asset rich, whereas it had low income. Conversely, Loughborough University of Technology Students’ Union had relatively high capitation fees and income, but few assets. Both unions wanted to develop student facilities on the campus, but there was a dispute as to how best to do this.

A scheme was devised whereby the university bought most of the land from Union of Loughborough Colleges and agreed on a land swap so the students would own an area of land adjacent to the Ashby Road on which a new student building was subsequently built. Both student groupings agreed to this and voted to adopt a new joint constitution. Elections were held in March and Loughborough Students’ Union was founded on 1 August 1975. Its founder president was David S Dixon, who held the position in 1975–76.

=== The Union of Loughborough Colleges ===
Established as an umbrella body to represent the students of Loughborough College of Technology, Loughborough College of Education, Loughborough Training College and Loughborough College of Art and Design, the Union of Loughborough Colleges operated from Rutland Lodge. Over the first half of the 20th century, the ULC acquired land which has continued to place its successor unions in a unique position.

=== Loughborough University of Technology Students Union ===
With the splitting of Loughborough College in 1965, and the by-then College of Advanced Technology's subsequent application for University status, LUTSU was created to represent the students of the university. At the time the legislation which enabled the creation of the university was understood to require an autonomous Union. LUTSU was created with the approval of Loughborough University of Technology's royal charter by the Privy Council in 1966.

LUTSU operated from the Edward Herbert Building (EHB) at the centre of the campus, and hosted concerts with artists such as the Rolling Stones. During the first 3 years of the new institutional arrangements there were various disputes over who owned the land acquired by ULC, which the continuing ULC wanted to sell to fund their own new building. Negotiations led by the university resolved the dispute in August 1975, when LUTSU and ULC merged to form Loughborough Students' Union.

=== Loughborough Students' Union ===
Following the merger the construction of a new students' union building began, although this project was placed in jeopardy by the liquidation of the building firm employed, almost leaving the building unfinished, however the building was completed and opened by Terry Jones and Michael Palin on 20 February 1979

== Governance ==
=== LSU Executive ===
The LSU Executive (frequently known as 'The Exec') are the leading representative body of the Students' Union. Since 2019, it has consisted of five Executive Officers. 'Exec Elections' occur each year in February and March, whereby a new Executive Team is voted in by the students. Candidates release manifestos, get interviewed on Loughborough Campus Radio, and promote themselves across campus and on social media in hope of being elected.

The current Executive Officer Team is made up of the following positions:

- President (Mia Jackson) is responsible for leading the Executive, and upholding the reputation of the organisation, as well as playing a key role in the development of the strategic plan.
- Democracy and Community Executive Officer (Lucy Palmer) is responsible for promoting the union and a democratic system within it. Working alongside the Student Voice Committee, they are to encourage accountability within the Union and develop the strategic plan.
- Academic Experience Executive Officer (Rebecca Schofield) is responsible for supporting and improving the academic experience for all students represented by LSU.
- Sport Executive Officer (Frankie Suckling) leads the Athletic Union, and represents all students within all sport at Loughborough.
- Equity, Diversity and Inclusion Executive Officer (Harry Huffen) concentrates on educating Loughborough Students on Welfare and Equity, Diversity and Inclusion issues, and leads multiple campaigns to develop this awareness.

== Sections and student involvement ==
The students' union is a constant hive of activity. Along with Loughborough University's numerous sports clubs the union hosts and organises many other activities, clubs and societies catering for a wide range of interests. At the beginning of each academic year the Freshers Bazaar is held to allow students, especially new arrivals, to talk to existing members of these clubs and societies and to provide an early opportunity to sign up.

=== Loughborough Students' Athletic Union ===
See also Loughborough Students RUFC, Loughborough Students' Hockey Club.

Loughborough Students Athletic Union is steeped in history and has a tradition of sporting excellence, exhibiting a history of dominance across a number of specific sports such as rugby union. Loughborough has dominated University sport for 30 years, having won the British Universities and Colleges Sport championships for the last 44 consecutive years.

This success is celebrated through a number of channels, not least the weekly Wednesday Hey Ewe event and WOW Magazine (Walk On Water) which is a quarterly sports publication documents Loughborough's sporting success. The Athletic Union has full-time staff members and one sabbatical officer (Sport Executive Officer).

=== Loughborough Students' Action ===
Action is the main volunteering section of the Union and is a vital in improving the relationships with the local community. Approximately there are 2,000 active volunteers a year, undertaking a wide range of activities, such as going away to a Kids Camp for a week, assisting in special needs schools, running one day sports events for 200 children and helping conserve Outwoods, the local forest, by chopping down trees.

=== Loughborough Students' Rag ===
The Rag office is responsible for organising, encouraging and supporting charity fund-raising amongst the union's members, and is the largest of such organisations in Europe, raising over £1,000,000 each year for a variety of charities. In 2013–14, Rag raised £1,411,510. The chairperson of the organisation is elected via a campus-wide ballot as part of LSU's Spring Term exec elections. They are tasked with co-ordinating the busy Rag calendar, which includes Rag Raids, Annual Events and Challenge Events; activities every weekend.

"Choose a Charity Challenge" evening, in LSU building, offers students a chance to sign up to charitable events, including a Sky Dive, A trek to Morocco, London to Paris Cycle, Istanbul Marathon and Rag Raids - bucket shaking in different parts of the country. The current Rag Chair being .

=== Loughborough Students' Media ===
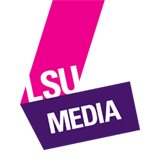
LSU Media logo

The students' union has its own purpose-built multi-media centre, opened in 1999, it is home to union's media activities which are coordinated by a committee annually chosen by the previous year's chair. Previously to this £1.4m development Media was spread in various locations across the campus, including LCR which was for almost 30 years based in a small set of studios in the Student Village. The Media section provides a number of services for the students on the campus and gives volunteers the chance to experience media work. Since the role's creation in 2007, the Media Section Chair's (originally Head of Media) responsibilities are aiding the Station Managers of LSUTV and LCR, the Head of Lens, and the Editor in Chief of Label. There are four production outlets (sections) which operate semi-autonomously, with their own committees and leadership. The current Media Chair is Rebecca Godsmark.

==== Label Magazine ====
Label is the magazine of Loughborough Students' Union. Evolving from a previous newspaper format inventively titled The Newspaper, Label was launched in 1997 and was distributed around campus and town with 2,500 copies printed each issue. Previously a weekly publication, from 2007 to 2017 it was fortnightly, when the role of editor changed from a paid sabbatical officer to a student volunteering position. The magazine launched its website in 2010, and from 2018 is now solely an online publication, with two special print editions a year published. The current Label Editor-In-Chief is Adam Affandy.

==== Loughborough Campus Radio ====
LCR broadcasts 24 hours a day during term time through its website. One of the oldest student radio stations in the UK, LCR started as a pirate radio broadcast from a suitcase in Hazelrigg Hall of residence in 1970. Known as Radio Mule - a Small Station with a Kick, it had become so popular after 3 years that the students voted to turn it into a legitimate station, over a student magazine. University Radio Loughborough was born, and went live on-air in 1973 (two years before LSU itself was founded), with the name was changing to LCR in 1983. Initially broadcast through induction loops on the roofs of each hall of residence, it was one of the first UK student stations to move to the new free radiating low-powered AM licence in October 1999, with webcasting starting later the same academic year. In 2007 the AM transmitter was severely damaged in a fire, and LCR have continued to be a solely online station since.

LCR has a regular term-time schedule, including weekday breakfast show Good Morning Loughborough, mid-afternoon entertainment show The Bubble, and non-stop DJ mixes throughout the night in The Nightshift, as well as a number of new, volunteer-ran shows such as Panic, It's a Wonderful Luff, and Under The Microscope. As well as its regular programming, LCR also plays host to specialist shows such as the UK's longest running student radio show - The Alternative Alternative Show - which has been broadcasting continually since the 1980s, with its monthly jazz chart is published in the Jazzwise magazine. The station also provides special live coverage of major events both in the university and across the UK, such as the LSU Executive Elections, major sporting events and general elections. The current LCR station manager is Andrew Dallas.

==== LSUTV ====
Established in 2001 as an expansion of the Media Centre, LSUTV originally broadcast online and via SUBtv plasma screens. It works at a professional level and as an independent production company, producing news, sport and documentaries alongside what The Independent described as one of the best student programmes, Totty TV (now known as Freshen Up). Running industry-standard shows both from a gallery and studio in the Students' Union as well as outside broadcasts across campus, LSUTV is known for its live broadcasting, and a number of notable alumni have continued within the industry after being members, including broadcasters Ore Oduba, Radzi Chinyanganya, Ben Croucher, Hannah Wilkes, Lewis Prince, Laura Winter and Katie Shanahan, and journalist Bryony Hopkins. The current LSUTV station managers are Edward Browne and Jake Hallworth.

LSUTV has been extremely successful on a national level at the NaSTA Awards. Ore Oduba has collected Best On-Screen Male, Loughborough Gold has scooped Best Sport and Best Title Sequence and LSUTV's coverage of the Real Varsity in 2008 picked up Best Live. In the 2010s, LSUTV was one of the most successful NaSTA stations, picking up 21 awards and over 15 commendations. In 2011, LSUTV was the host station, and Loughborough Gold scooped Best Sport Programme for a second year, and their coverage of the Dan James Memorial Match won Best Live Programme. LSUTV hosted the NaSTA Awards once again in 2014 and won four awards, with alumna Radzi Chinyanganya hosting, and in 2015 and 2016 picked up two more awards. NaSTA 2017 saw LSUTV pick up three more (all for their sports coverage), and in 2018 came a win for Goodbye Carolyn in the Best Writing category. At the 2019 edition, LSUTV won Best Animation and Best Live Programme, for their coverage of the Fight Night kickboxing competition held between Lougborough and Edinburgh universities, and in 2020 the station brought home six awards, including Best Documentary, Best Sport and Highly Commended Best Broadcaster. LSUTV will again host the NaSTA Awards in 2026.

In August 2025, LSUTV broadcast 38 matches in 10 days for the International Federation of Cerebral Palsy Football (IFCPF)'s 2025 Men's Euros and Women's Intercontinental Cup, a first for the station.

==== Lens ====
The photography section of LSU Media was founded in 2014, with the first Head of Lens being Isabella Piggott. Lens was introduced into LSU Media as part of VP Media Bryn Wilkes' manifesto, originally coming from the Label magazine section. There is currently a committee of six people, who manage a team of photographers providing photos for events, union nights and more. Lens exists to cover as many events involving or affecting Lougborough University and College students. The team also collaborate with Label, LCR and LSUTV to provide photography when necessary. The current head of Lens is Eliona Seraj.

==== Match Report ====
The flagship Sports brand from LSU Media, Match Report aims to showcase all Sport on campus using all four media sections. Co-created by Jack Connor-Richards, Jamie Lynch, Chris Moore and Jennifer Taylor, the show picked up 3 NaSTA Awards in its debut year including Best Sports, Best Live, Mars El Brogy Award for multi-platform content and also highly commended for Technical. After an initial run as a weekly half-hour sports roundup show, Match Report now focuses on broadcasting full live sports coverage, on matches across Loughborough, and showcases both games from BUCS and Big Matches, including fixtures against Premier League 2 sides Liverpool and Wolves.

=== Loughborough Students' Societies ===
LSU runs numerous clubs and societies catering for many different tastes including hot air ballooning, Computer Society, SCOGUI (Scout and Guide club, affiliated to SSAGO) and Labour Students. One of the oldest clubs is the university Motor Club LSUMC. In 2007, Sabrina Johnson, the first Sabbatical Officer with overall responsibility for this section, was elected. Since then, Societies has been set up, which is the collective group of societies, similar in nature to what the AU is to Loughborough Sport.

== Facilities and events ==
There are a range of retail outlets in and around the Student Union building. The first floor incorporates the Administrative parts of the Students' Union. The ground floor of the Union building consists of three bars.

=== Weekly events ===
At night, Loughborough Students' Union hosts various nights suitable for all students.

Happy Mondays is a weekly arts event, run in collaboration with Loughborough University Arts.

Stuesday is co-hosted by sports teams and student societies, offering drink deals and music.

Hey Ewe, on a Wednesday evening, is traditionally the night to celebrate Loughborough's sporting successes from BUCS Wednesday. Three rooms of music are open all night with different events and performers frequently on offer throughout the night. Previous events include a Fifa Tournament and a Darts Competition.

FND has, for over 30 years, been Loughborough's premier night out. Every Friday, the Union opens its doors to thousands of students and frequent performers. FND is considered to be the biggest student club night in the UK.

Subversion is LSU's fortnightly alternative night. Every other Saturday, Rock, Emo, Punk, Metal music and everything in between are provided by LSU's Rock Society DJs.

Unity is a monthly event aimed at International Students. Global music is played all night and there are games on offer.

=== LSU Trips ===
LSU run frequent trips at weekends, visiting various parts of the country. Recent trips include London, Leeds, Stratford-Upon-Avon and Manchester. Trips are frequently fully booked and offer a chance for students to explore the country.

=== Free Fest ===
Free Fest is an annual free-to-attend outdoor music concert originally organised by the Union's Musicians Society (known as Musoc), which takes place all day on the May Day bank holiday weekend. Originally conceived in 1996 by the then editor of the student magazine Label, Emily Dubberley, as a simple May Day music festival with professional acts, it was enhanced in 1997 when Musoc began to use it as a showcase for student bands. It is now organised by the Technical Department's student production crew. Competition for inclusion in Free Fest is always high, as such it has become necessary to hold Auditions and a Fringe Festival has been added to encompass more acts, this takes place during the penultimate weekend before the main Free Fest. In 2006 around 10 bands performed at Free Fest, including the only non-student act Carlton Cole (who has become something of an institution at FreeFest) and guitarist Dave Rogers. In 2006 Post Fest, an alternative music club night held in Room 1 following the bands, which was originally conceived and run by LSU Rocksoc, was taken over as an official part of the event and featured a wide variety of music from one of LSU's resident DJ's.

From 2009 Free Fest, now a considerable venture, became a two-day event starting on the Sunday, the 2009 event was also the first FreeFest to restrict attendees to drinks purchased from the Union. However, in 2011, due to a desire to save money, the event was toned down, back to being more like the original stage-on-the-back-of-a-lorry event as well as only being held on the one day, and has continued in a similar format since.

== Awards and achievements ==
- Best Students' Union - Whatuni? Student Choice Awards 2015 and 2016
- Highest Rated Students' Union - Whatuni? Student Choice Awards 2014
- Best International Experience - National Union of Students Internationalisation Awards 2012
- Best Student Experience 2006 - 2012 - Times Higher Education League Table
- Best Student Experience 2016 - 2018 - Times Higher Education Student Experience Survey
- Best Sports and Societies - Whatuni? Student Choice Awards 2020

=== Internal awards ===
- Loughborough Experience Awards recognises students and staff of Loughborough, all of whom have made an exceptional contribution to the Loughborough experience.
- Loughborough Academic Awards celebrate staff and student excellence in learning, teaching and academic representation across the campus. Over 200 people attended the event at the Students' Union, including deans, heads of department and other university staff, student volunteers, union executive members and union staff.
- Welfare and Diversity, Societies, Media, Enterprise and Employability, Rag and Action Awards all recognise individuals and teams who make a considerable impact to their section throughout the year.

== See also ==
- Loughborough University
- Loughborough College
- Loughborough Campus Radio
- National Union of Students
