= Dubberley =

Dubberley is a surname. Notable people with the surname include:

- Brad Dubberley (born 1981), Australian wheelchair rugby player and coach
- Emily Dubberley (born 1974), British author and journalist
