= Van Den Berghe =

Van den Berghe or Vandenberghe is a Belgian topographic surname meaning in [Flemish] "from the mountain". The first form is most common in East Flanders while the concatenated version is most abundant in West Flanders. Closely related names are Van den Berg, common in the Netherlands, and Van den Bergh. Notable people with the surname include:

Van den Berghe:

- Alexis "Lex" van den Berghe, American reality show contestant
- Christoffel van den Berghe (1590–1645), Dutch Golden Age painter
- Frits Van den Berghe (1883–1939), Belgian painter
- Garry Van Den Berghe (born 1960), Canadian curler
- Herman Van Den Berghe (1933–2017), Belgian geneticist
- Paul Van den Berghe (born 1933), Belgian Roman Catholic bishop and theologian
- Pierre L. van den Berghe (1933–2019), Belgian anthropologist and sociologist

Vandenberghe:

- Georges Vandenberghe (1941–1983), Belgian cyclist
- Hugo Vandenberghe (b. 1942), Belgian politician and academic
- Roger Vandenberghe (1927–1952), French soldier in WWII and Indochina War
- Tom Vandenberghe (b. 1992), Belgian footballer

== See also ==
- Van den Bergh
