= Vandenberg (surname) =

Vandenberg or Vandenburg is a surname that is a variation on the Dutch and Flemish surname "van den Berg", literally meaning "from the mountain" (a Dutch reference to a somewhat higher place in the landscape). The version treating it as a single word is current mainly in English-speaking countries.

Notable people with the name include:

- Adrian Vandenberg, Dutch guitarist who has worked with Whitesnake
  - Vandenberg (band), his band
- Arielle Vandenberg, American actress
- Arthur H. Vandenberg (1884–1951), U.S. Senator from Michigan
- Arthur H. Vandenberg, Jr. (1907–1968), government official, politician, son of the U.S. Senator
- Don VandenBerg, Canadian astronomer
- Hoyt Vandenberg (1899–1954), second Chief of Staff of the Air Force of the United States
- Hoyt S. Vandenberg, Jr. (born 1928), U.S. military officer
- James Vandenberg, quarterback for the University of Iowa Hawkeyes
- Joanna Maria Vandenberg (born 1938), Dutch crystallographer based in USA
- Kim Vandenberg, American swimmer
- Malcolm VandenBurg, English doctor
- Richie Vandenberg (born 1977), Australian rules footballer

== See also ==
- Van den Berg, surname
- Vandenbergh, surname
- Vanderburg, surname
