= Vandenbergh =

Vandenbergh is a surname. Notable people with the surname include:

- Erwin Vandenbergh (born 1959), Belgian footballer
- John Vandenbergh, Professor Emeritus of zoology at North Carolina State University
- Kevin Vandenbergh (born 1983), Belgian footballer
- Lydia Vandenbergh (born 1984), American soccer midfielder
- Sarah Vandenbergh (born 1972), Australian actress
- Stijn Vandenbergh (born 1984), professional road racing cyclist

== See also ==
- Vandenbergh's Regiment of Militia
- Vandenbergh effect, early induction of the first estrous cycle in prepubertal female mice using male mouse urine
- Van den Bergh
- Vandenberg Disambig uation
