= Los Tacos No. 1 =

American taqueria restaurant chain

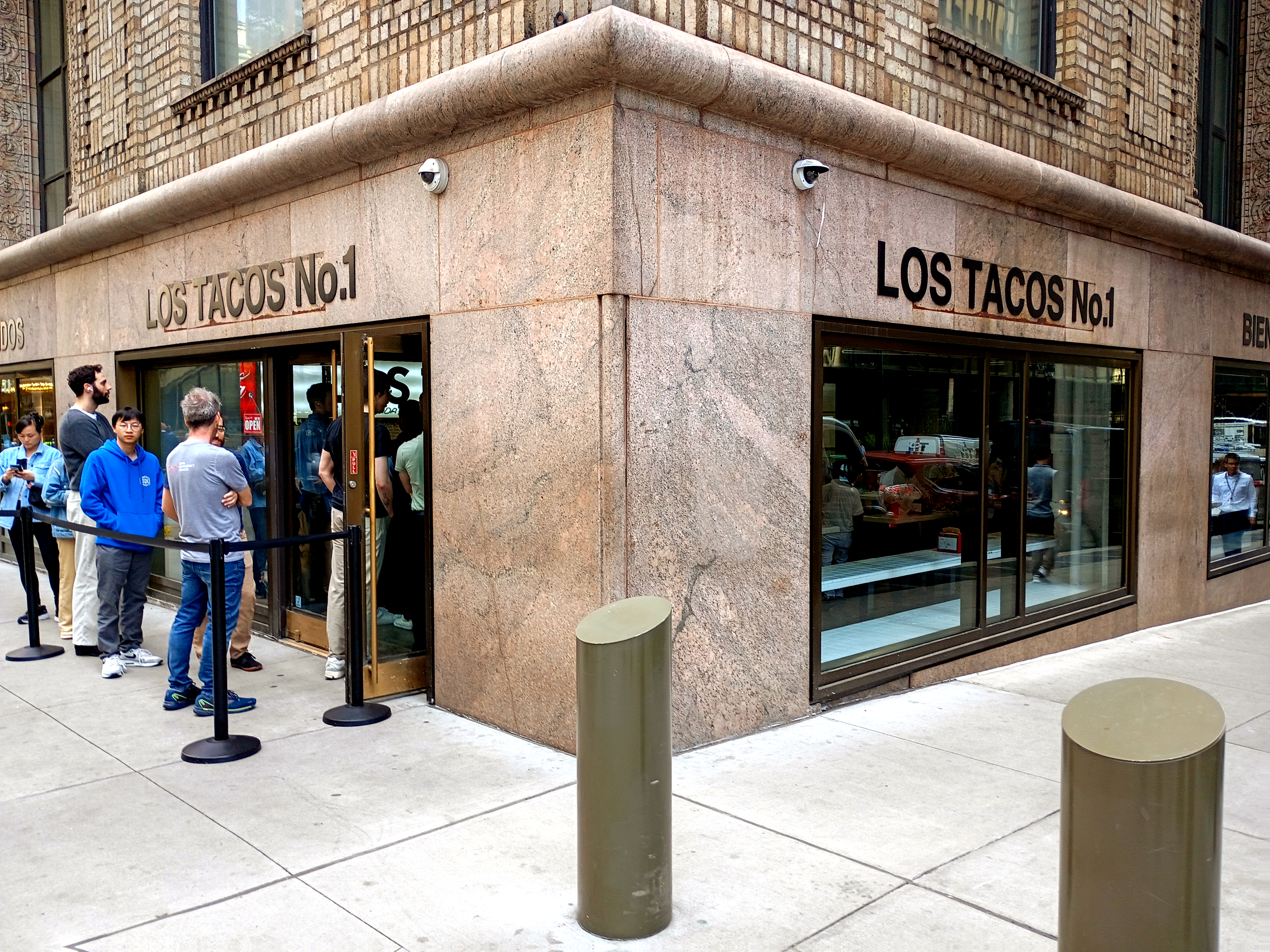
- Exterior of Los Tacos No. 1 on 125 Park Avenue, Manhattan, in 2025
- Type: Private
- Industry: Fast casual restaurant
- Founded: May 2013; 13 years ago in Chelsea, Manhattan, New York, U.S.
- Founders: Christian Pineda; Tyler Sanders; Kyle Cameron
- Number of locations: 9 (2026)
- Area served: Manhattan
- Products: Tacos; quesadillas; aguas frescas
- Website: www.lostacos1.com

Los Tacos No. 1 is a fast casual taqueria chain located in New York City that specializes in Tijuana-style tacos. It was founded in 2013 by Christian Pineda, Tyler Sanders, and Kyle Cameron, as a taco stand in Chelsea Market in Chelsea, Manhattan, and it has since expanded to nine locations throughout Manhattan as of 2026.

== History ==
Los Tacos No. 1 was founded in May 2013 by Tijuana native Christian Pineda alongside Tyler Sanders and Kyle Cameron, both from Brawley, California. Pineda was inspired to start the restaurant after visiting New York City and finding the city's taco options lacking. The restaurant's original location takes the form of a simple taco stand in Chelsea Market in Chelsea, Manhattan, with no designated seating area.

In July 2017, Los Tacos No. 1 expanded to a second location at 229 West 43rd Street in Times Square, their first standalone restaurant. A third location in Tribeca was announced in 2018.

In 2020, after briefly closing due to the COVID-19 pandemic, Los Tacos No. 1 installed a new to-go window facing West 15th Street and reopened for takeout and delivery orders. Sanders said the pandemic "decimated" the restaurant's customer base, leading the founders to approach the reopening "as the launch of a new restaurant" according to Eater.

As of March 2026, Los Tacos No. 1 has nine locations throughout Manhattan, with at least one more planned.

== Menu ==
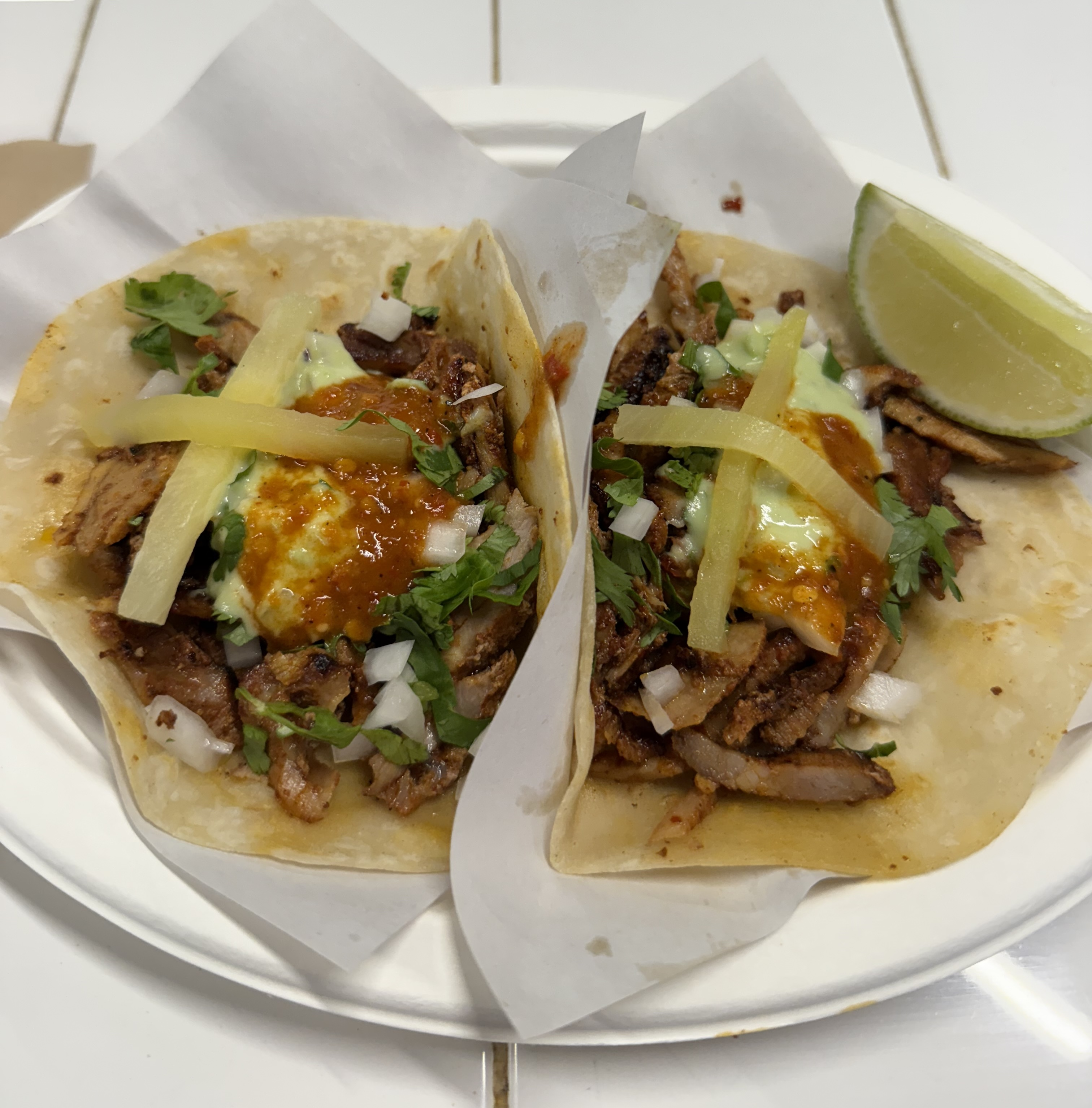
Adobada tacos from Los Tacos No. 1

Since its launch, Los Tacos No. 1 has offered four varieties of tacos—carne asada, adobada (a Tijuana-area term for pork al pastor), pollo asado, and nopal—which can be ordered on corn or flour tortillas. The restaurant also offers quesadillas (including a deep-fried variant known as the "especial"), tortilla chips and guacamole, and a range of aguas frescas and Mexican soft drinks. Some locations also offer breakfast burritos in the mornings.

The three co-founders of Los Tacos No. 1 also oversee Los Mariscos, an offshoot restaurant located in Chelsea Market that specializes in fish tacos and ceviche.

== Reception ==
In August 2013, The New York Times food writer Jeff Gordinier awarded Los Tacos No. 1 a Critic's Pick, writing in praise of the restaurant's adobada: "It manages to stay at the right temperature and texture with the fiery help of something that resembles a stationary blowtorch. Sliced on the spot, juicy and tender and gently spicy like a Mexican twist on shawarma, it's righteous enough to make a whiny Westerner weep with homesickness." However, he criticized the restaurant's nopal, calling it "slimy and flavorless."

In a 2018 review, Eater writer Ryan Sutton recommended Los Tacos No. 1's Times Square location as an option for theatergoers in Manhattan's Theater District, specifically hailing the restaurant's flour tortillas: "The flour tortillas—seldom seen at New York's better Mexican restaurants—are among the city's best at Los Tacos. They are laced with lard (versus vegetable shortening) and rolled out so thin that they're translucent like tissue paper." In another 2018 review, Sutton criticized the breakfast burritos available at some of the restaurant's locations, describing that "the tortillas are damp and limp, as if they've been steaming in their aluminum foil casing for hours."

In a 2023 piece for Texas Monthly outlining New York City's taco scene, José R. Ralat called Los Tacos No. 1 "perhaps the most famous of New York's taquerias," but added that "its tacos likely won't change a Texan's life."
