= Vandenberg =

Vandenberg may refer to:

- Vandenberg (surname), including a list of people with the name
- USNS General Hoyt S. Vandenberg (T-AGM-10), transport ship in the United States Navy, sank as an artificial reef in Key West, Florida
- Vandenberg Space Force Base, a United States military installation with a spaceport
- Vandenberg (band), a Dutch hard rock band
  - Vandenberg (album), their 1982 debut album
- Vandenberg resolution, a United States Congress resolution passed in 1948
