= Azobilirubin =

Purple diazo compound derived from bilirubin

Names
- IUPAC name 4-[[5-[(3-Ethenyl-4-methyl-5-oxopyrrol-2-ylidene)methyl]-4-methyl-3-propyl-1H-pyrrol-2-yl]diazenyl]benzenesulfonic acid

Identifiers
3D model (JSmol)	Interactive image
ChemSpider	65322146
PubChem CID	137178910
- InChI: InChI=1S/C22H24N4O4S/c1-5-7-18-13(3)19(12-20-17(6-2)14(4)22(27)24-20)23-21(18)26-25-15-8-10-16(11-9-15)31(28,29)30/h6,8-12,23H,2,5,7H2,1,3-4H3,(H,24,27)(H,28,29,30) Key: KWUVBOWGSGQACE-UHFFFAOYSA-N
- SMILES: CCCC1=C(NC(=C1C)C=C2C(=C(C(=O)N2)C)C=C)N=NC3=CC=C(C=C3)S(=O)(=O)O

Properties
Chemical formula	C_{22}H_{24}N_{4}O_{4}S
Molar mass	440.52 g·mol^{−1}
- Except where otherwise noted, data are given for materials in their standard state (at 25 °C [77 °F], 100 kPa). Infobox references

Azobilirubin is a coloured compound formed by the condensation of diazotized sulfanilic acid with bilirubin in the van den Bergh reaction. The quantity of bilirubin in patients with jaundice can be determined by the formation of azobilirubin in the presence of methanol.

The Van den Bergh chemical reaction which is used to measure bilirubin levels, couples bilirubin with diazotized sulfanilic acid. This reaction produced azo pigments, or azobilirubin. The presence of azobilirubin is best indicated by the emergence of a pink-purple color. The intensity of the color will also indicate how much bilirubin is in the blood. Color markers and indicators can be changed. Adding alkaline tartrate can make the purple azobilirubin into a blue azobilirubin. If we have high levels of bilirubin in the blood, the Van den Bergh chemical reaction is used to determine if the bilirubin is conjugated or unconjugated.

Azobilirubin can also be used to determine how much conjugated bilirubin is the blood compared to that of unconjugated bilirubin. This process is done by using both forms of bilirubin alongside a diazo reagent and a caffeine-benzoate reagent. Conjugated bilirubin with the azo reagent will react, whilst the unconjugated bilirubin will not react with the azo reagent.
