= Van den Berghen =

Van den Berghen is a surname. Notable people with the surname include:

- Frans Van den Berghen (1919–2003), Belgian sprint canoer
- Willy Vanden Berghen (1939–2022), Belgian cyclist

== See also ==
- Van den Berg
