= Stella Michaels =

American cultural personality

- Born: New York, United States
- Education: New York University, New York, New York
- Known for: Painting
- Movement: Abstract Expressionism

Stella Michaels is an American painter and musician, born and raised in New York City who is also a curator at Stray Kat Gallery in New York with principal partners Zane Fix and Kat Dahl.

== Career ==
Stella Michaels earned her BFA at New York University. She became a pioneer of the “Rolling Thunder” Art gallery, selling her works from Mobile Pop Up Trucks with paintings of all sizes fastidiously displayed both inside and outside.

Her primary medium is enamel, acrylic and gold leaf on canvas, wood and vinyl records. Ms. Michaels is known for her wide array of application techniques, ranging from brightly colored, slick, pop graphics to highly textured "ambient" abstracts, combining paper appliqué with thick layers of paint. Her work has often been described as unique combinations of classic early and mid 20th century groundbreaking Impressionist and Abstract Expressionist painters.

Her 2012 exhibit, entitled, “The Road Less Traveled”, moved her into the spotlight as Stray Kat Gallery’s featured artist[5] in their highly visible, cavernous space in the Chelsea gallery district in New York City. Subsequently, she became a principal partner, as well as a featured artist at Stray Kat Gallery, since 2013. She has headlined many shows over the years, with various themes and titles, such as "Pinups, Parasols, and Pianos", "East Meets West, a Rising Sun", and "House of Pop and Soul".

In April, 2015, Stella's painting, "Houses of the Holy VI" was selected by Saatchi curator Rebecca Wilson in her top 10 choices for works for the Saatchi Art "Big and Bold" collection. Her most recent international exhibit, entitled "7", opened March 19, 2016 at Abbozzo Gallery in Toronto, Ontario.

== See also ==
- Stray Kat Gallery
