= Arlee, Montana =

- Census-designated place
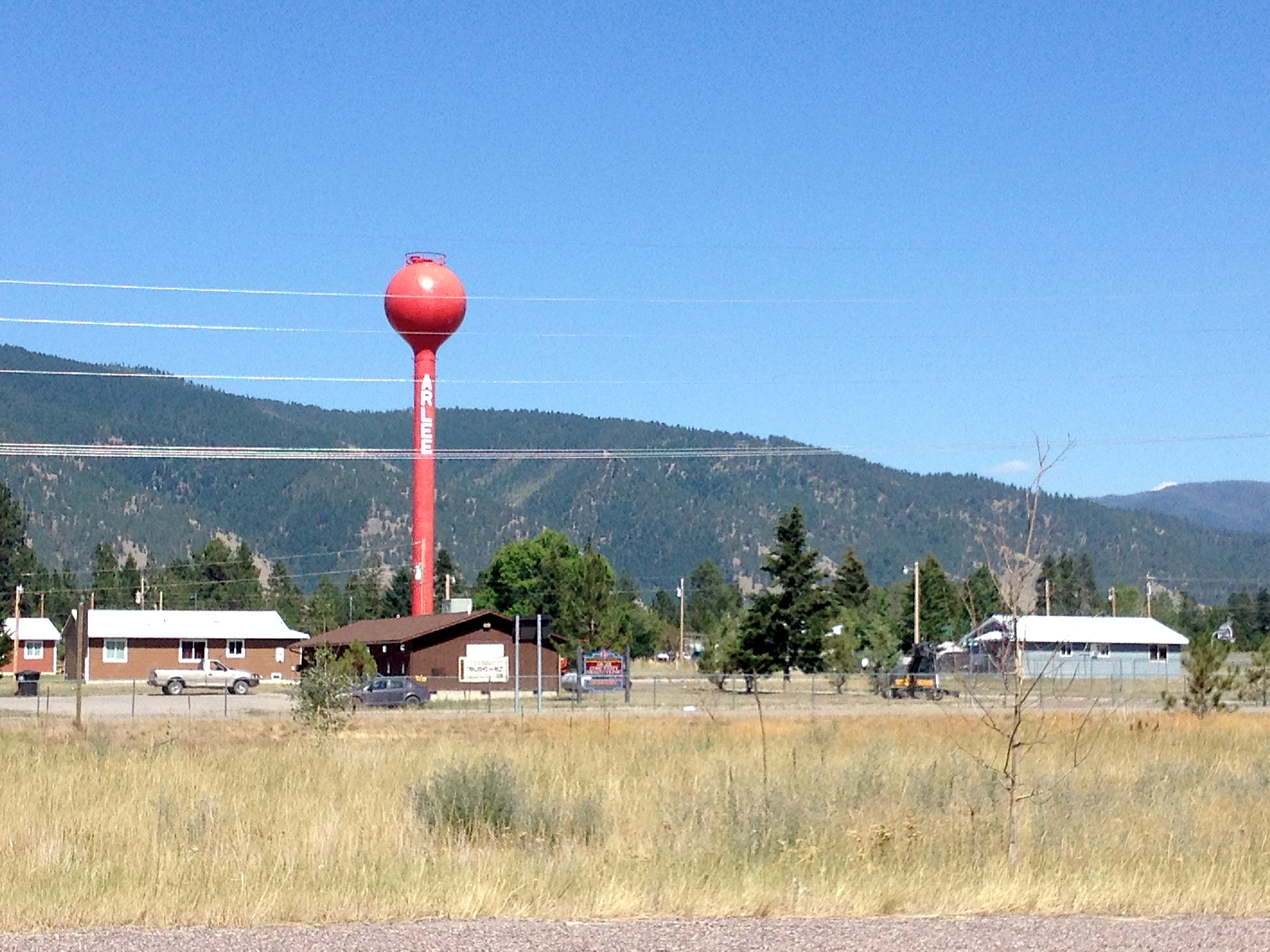
- Red water tower in Arlee

- Location of Arlee, Montana
- Coordinates: 47°11′25″N 114°06′24″W
- Country: United States
- State: Montana
- County: Lake

Area
  - Total: 6.47 sq mi (16.75 km^{2})
  - Land: 6.47 sq mi (16.75 km^{2})
  - Water: 0.0039 sq mi (0.01 km^{2})
- Elevation: 3,091 ft (942 m)

Population (2020)
  - Total: 720
  - Density: 147/sq mi (56.9/km^{2})
- Time zone: UTC-7 (Mountain (MST))
  - Summer (DST): UTC-6 (MDT)
- ZIP code: 59821
- Area code: 406
- FIPS code: 30-02425
- GNIS feature ID: 2407760

Arlee (Salish: nɫq̓alqʷ, nɫq̓a) is an unincorporated community and census-designated place (CDP) on the Flathead Reservation, Lake County, Montana, United States. The population was 725 at the 2020 census. It is named after Alee, a Salish chief. The chief's name has no "r", as the Salish alphabet has no letter "r".

== Geography ==
Arlee is in southern Lake County in the Jocko Valley. U.S. Route 93 and Montana Highway 200 pass through the community together, leading northwest 10 miles (16 km) to Ravalli and south 17 miles (27 km) to Interstate 90 at Wye. Polson, the Lake county seat, is 43 miles (69 km) north of Arlee via US 93.

According to the United States Census Bureau, the Arlee CDP has a total area of 6.5 square miles (16.8 km^{2}), of which 93,452.27 square feet (8,682 m^{2}), or 0.05%, are water. The Jocko River passes through the northeast side of the community, flowing northwest past Ravalli to the Flathead River at Sčilíp. Via the Flathead River, it is part of the Clark Fork and Columbia River watershed.

== Demographics ==
Historical population
| Census | Pop. | Note | %± |
|---|---|---|---|
| 2020 | 720 | | — |
U.S. Decennial Census

As of the census of 2000, there were 602 people, 235 households, and 161 families residing in the CDP. The population density was 92.8 inhabitants per square mile (35.8/km^{2}). There were 268 housing units at an average density of 41.3 units per square mile (15.9 units/km^{2}). The racial makeup of the CDP was 45.85% White, 50.00% Native American, 0.66% from other races, and 3.49% from two or more races. Hispanic or Latino of any race were 5.15% of the population.

There were 235 households, out of which 37.0% had children under the age of 18 living with them, 42.1% were married couples living together, 20.4% had a female householder with no husband present, and 31.1% were non-families. 26.8% of all households were made up of individuals, and 7.7% had someone living alone who was 65 years of age or older. The average household size was 2.56 and the average family size was 3.14.

In the CDP, the population was spread out, with 32.4% under the age of 18, 7.1% from 18 to 24, 28.2% from 25 to 44, 23.4% from 45 to 64, and 8.8% who were 65 years of age or older. The median age was 33 years. For every 100 females there were 104.8 males. For every 100 females age 18 and over, there were 91.1 males.

The median income for a household in the CDP was $21,188, and the median income for a family was $22,125. Males had a median income of $25,500 versus $19,167 for females. The per capita income for the CDP was $11,558. About 37.6% of families and 34.1% of the population were below the poverty line, including 51.2% of those under age 18 and 21.1% of those age 65 or over.

== History ==
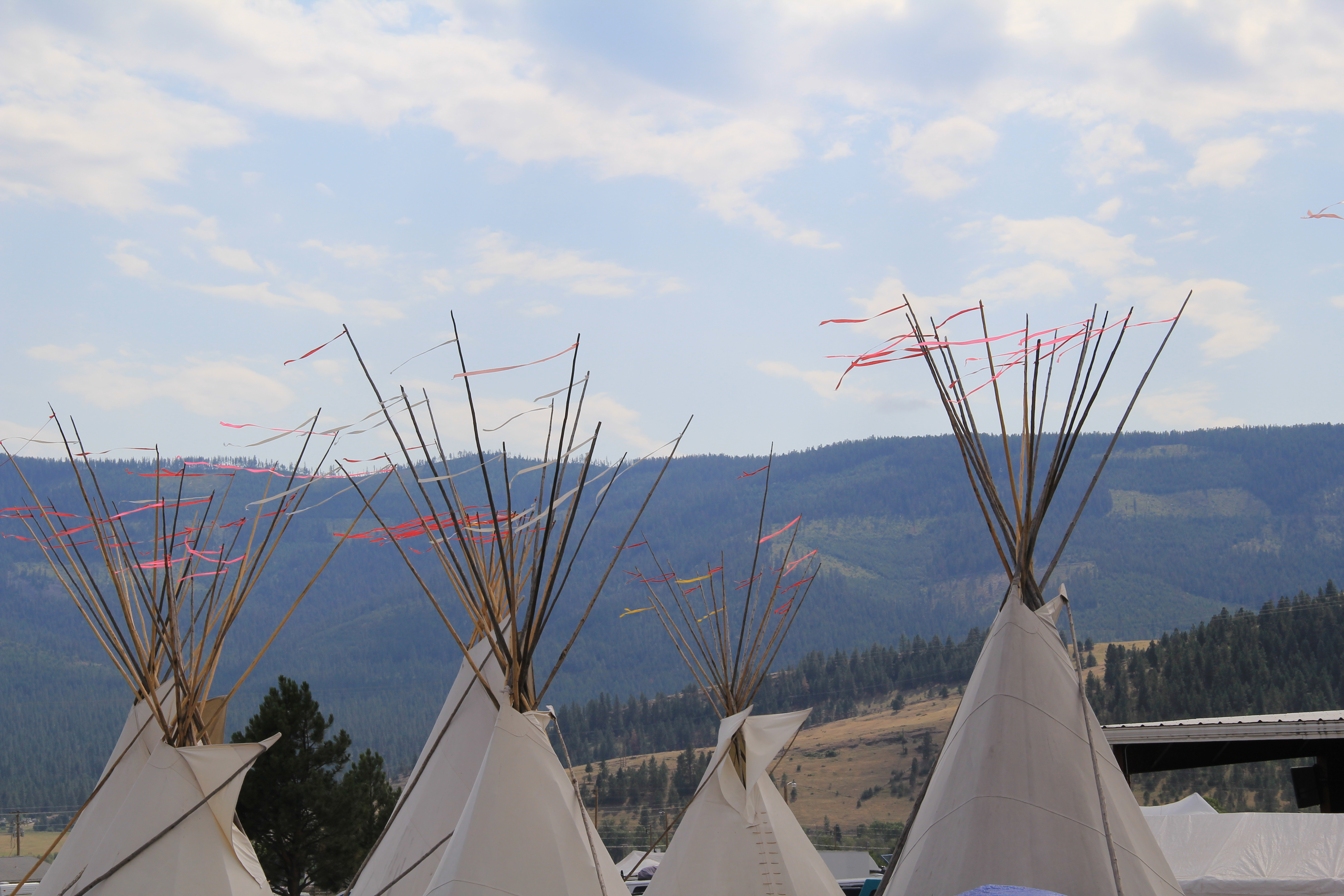
Tipis at Arlee Esyapqeyni 2015, the Arlee Celebration Pow Wow

Arlee was named after the Salish leader Arlee. In October 1873, he moved a small group of his people from the Bitterroot Valley, which was designated a "conditional reservation" in the 1855 Hellgate Treaty, to the Jocko Agency (later Flathead Indian Agency) located a few miles south of the current town of Arlee. This forced move stemmed from the efforts of a congressional delegation led by future president James Garfield to negotiate Salish removal from the Bitterroot Valley.

The town and post office were established in 1885.

== Culture ==
Arlee has an annual summer pow wow celebration, the Arlee Esyapqeyni. Montana Salish is taught at the Nkwusm Salish Immersion School.

Salish is spoken in Arlee. Art is popular, and there used to be a gallery that displayed art work. In the 1970s Agnes Vanderburg ran workshops where she passed on Salish culture to younger generations.

Rodeo has been a significant part of the area culture, with Native and non-native contestants competing. The annual Arlee Rodeo and Pow Wow is held on the 4th of July weekend. Numerous tribes participate in Native American regalia with dancing, singing and drumming.

== Education ==
The Arlee Joint School District educates students from kindergarten through 12th grade. Arlee High School is a Class B school. They are known as the Warriors and Scarlets. Brothers on Three, a New York Times Bestselling book in 2021, is a non-fiction account of students from Arlee and their families.

== Media ==
The Valley Journal provides local news to Arlee, Charlo, Pablo, Polson, Ronan, and St. Ignatius.

The radio station KJFT-FM is a Christian FM station licensed in Arlee.

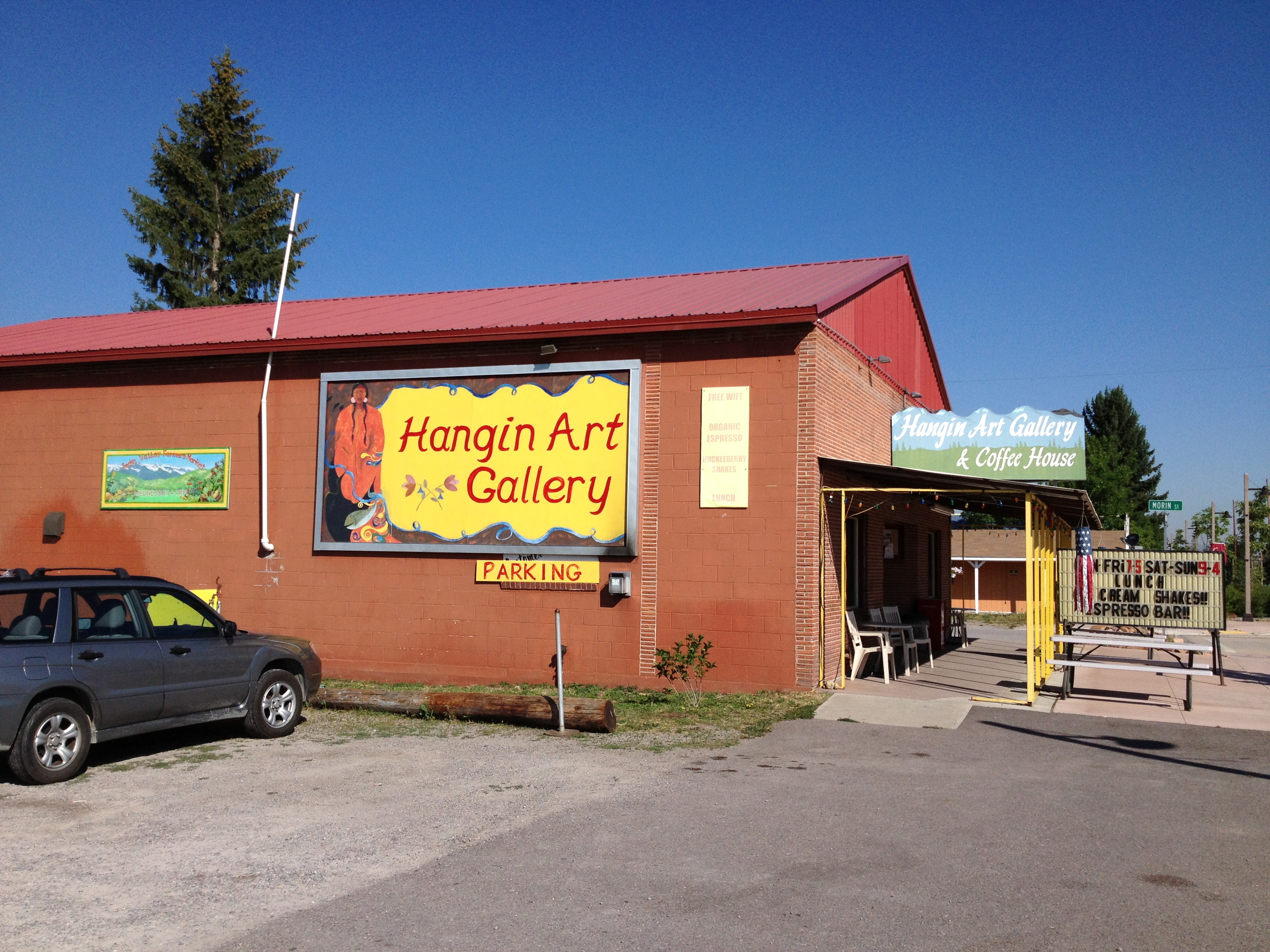
Hangin Art Gallery and Gallery Cafe, Arlee

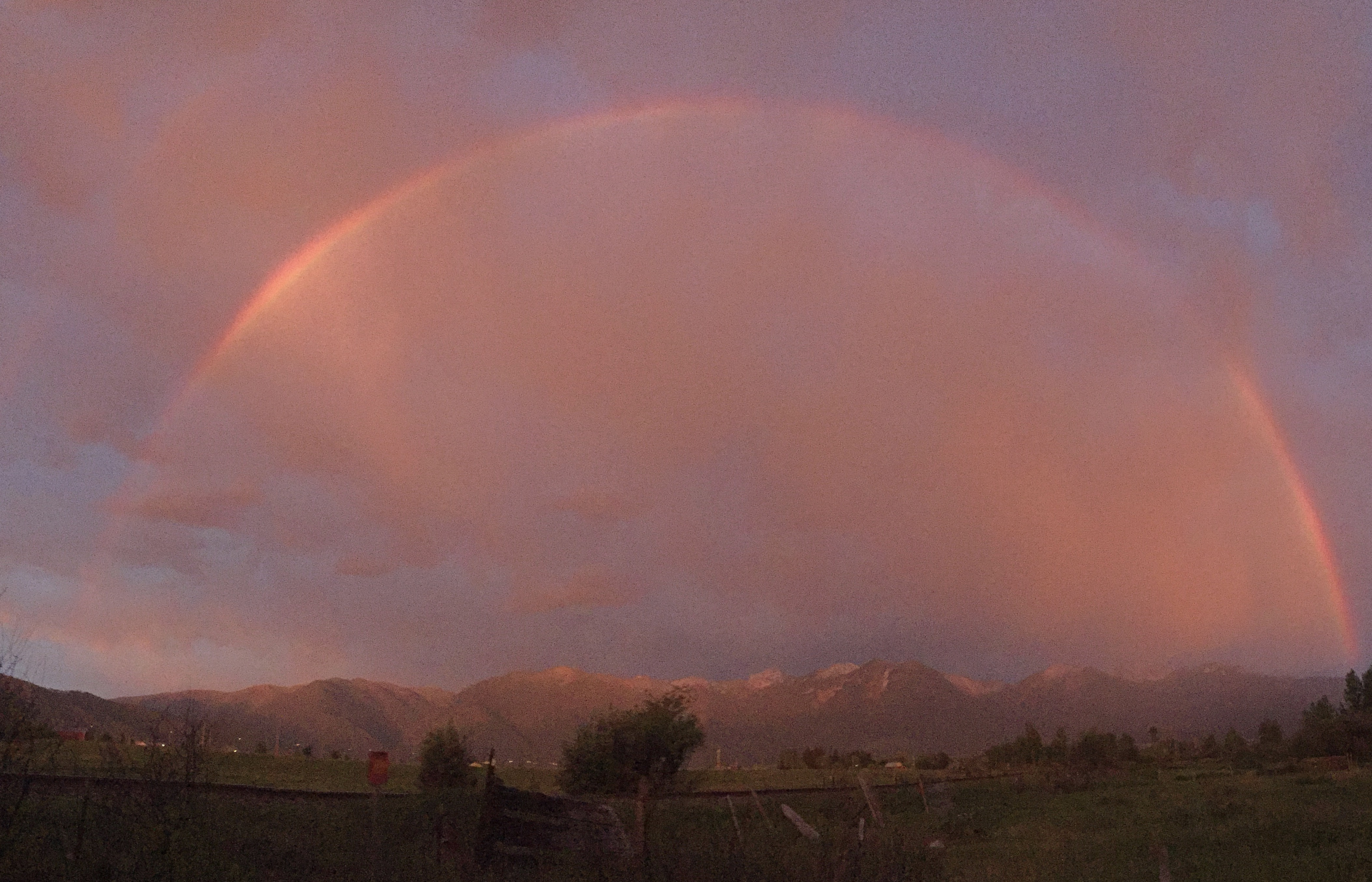
Rainbow over McLeod Peak looking east across Jocko Valley

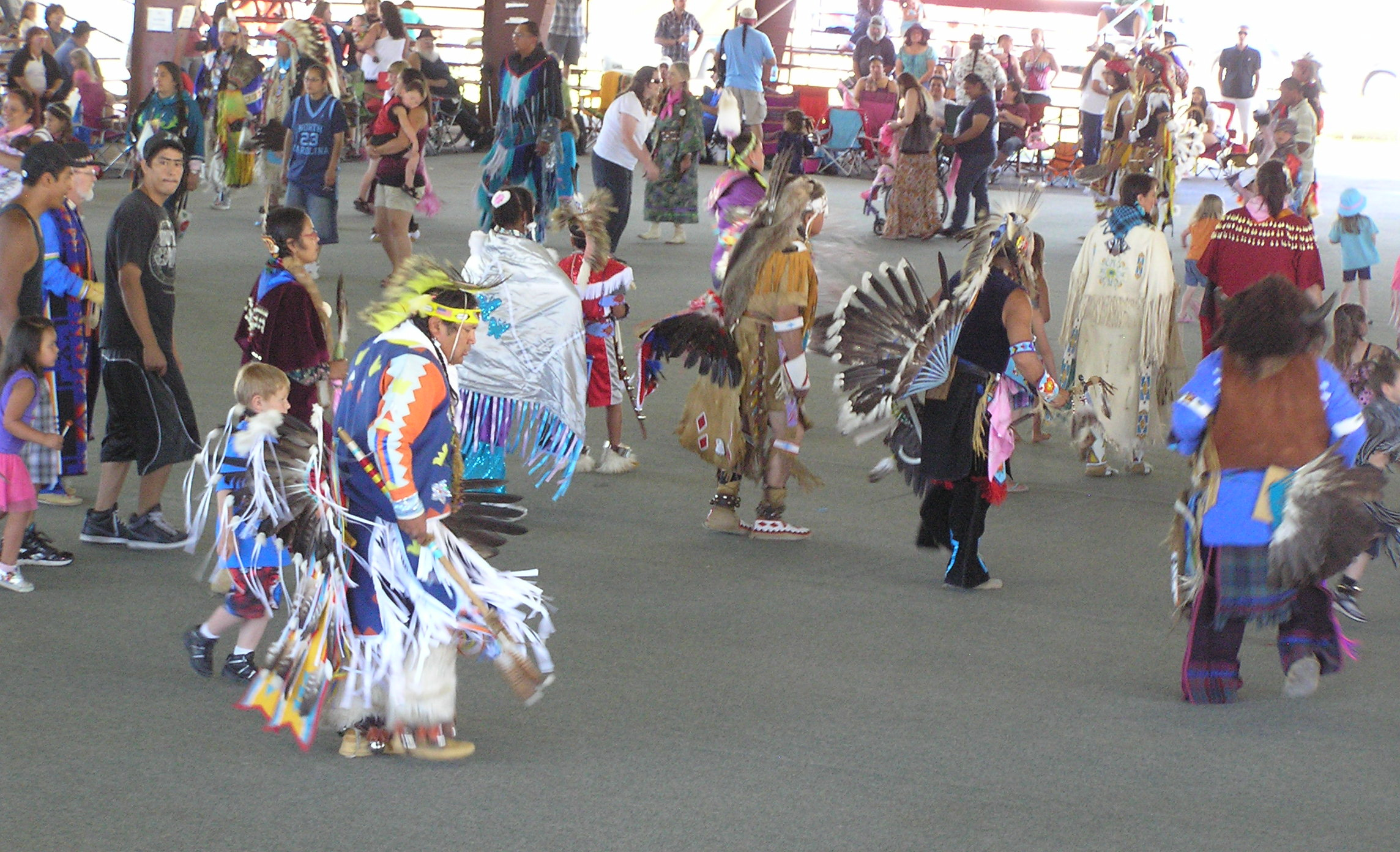
Arlee Celebration Powwow
