= Irwin Cohen (developer) =

American real estate developer (1933–2023)

- Born: Irwin Bernard Cohen; September 29, 1933; Brooklyn, New York, U.S.
- Died: December 18, 2023 (aged 90); Manhattan, New York, U.S.
- Occupation: Real Estate Developer
- Years active: 1958–2023
- Known for: Chelsea Market

Irwin Cohen (29 September 1933 – 18 December 2023) was an American lawyer, investor and real estate developer known for the creation of the Chelsea Market in New York City. The development, which included purchase of the buildings and renting the upper floors to tech companies, is credited with the revitalization and gentrification of the Chelsea, Manhattan neighborhood in the 1990s and after which he consulted on similar projects.

== Early life ==
Irwin Bernard Cohen was born on 29 September 1933, in Brooklyn, New York. His father was a tailor and owned a candy store, where Cohen's mother ran the soda fountain.

Cohen graduated from Tilden High School, then earned a business degree from New York University in 1954 and a law degree from Brooklyn Law School in 1958. To pay for his law school tuition, he worked as a photographer.

== Career ==
Cohen had previously developed old warehouses in Long Island City into retail buildings during the 1960s and helped revitalize an area north of Philadelphia City Hall by converting old buildings into mixed-use facilities in the 1970s.

Cohen, who is known for his eclectic design in the properties he developed,

== Personal ==
Cohen married Jill Framer in 1957 and lived in Manhattan. The couple had three daughters, 17 grandchildren, and 14 great-grandchildren. Cohen died of pneumonia. Cohen was a longtime donor to Brooklyn Law School, which features spaces named for Jill Cohen.
