= Chelsea Market =

Multi-use building in New York City

- U.S. Historic district – Contributing property
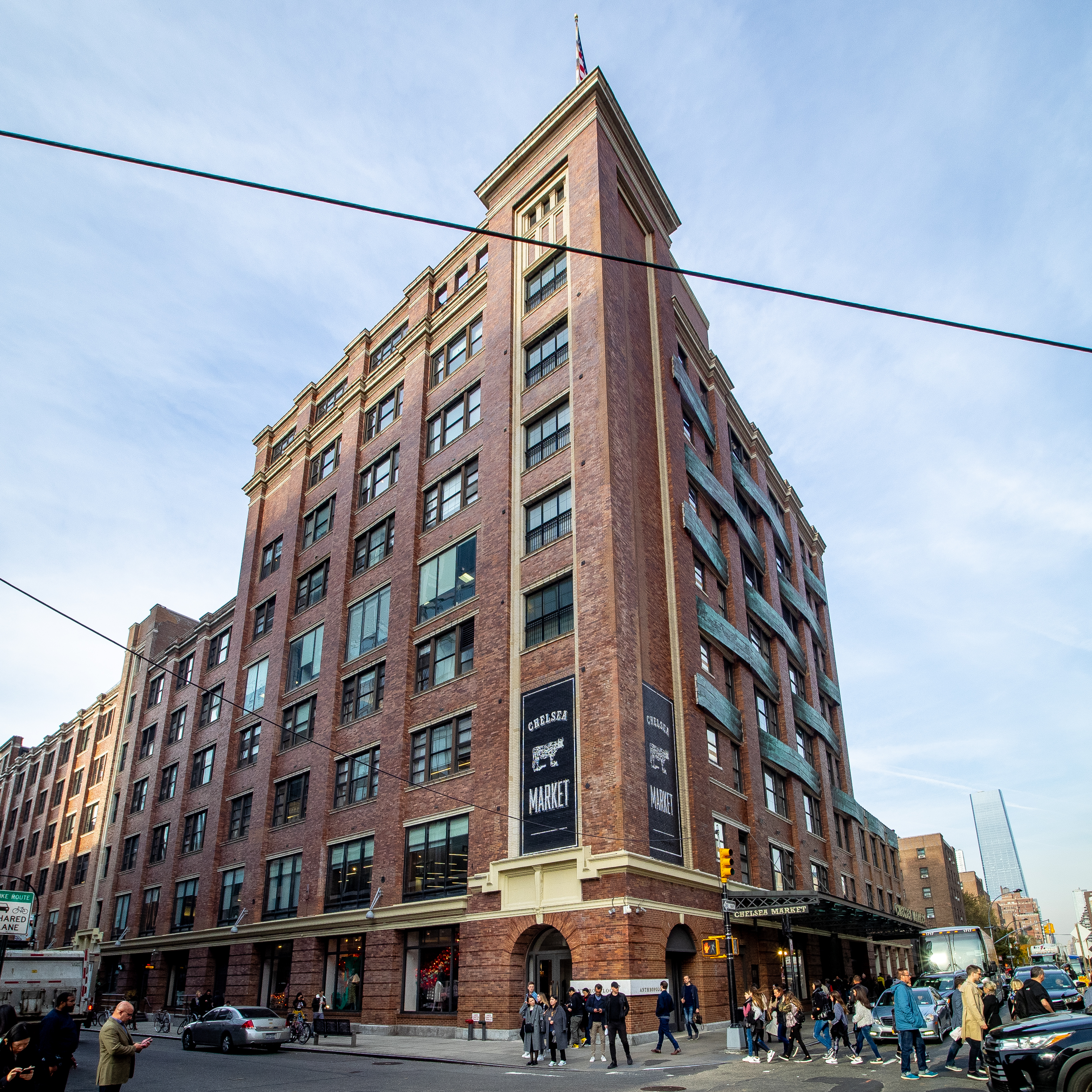
- Chelsea Market from south on Ninth Avenue
- Location: Roughly bounded by West 16th Street to the north; 9th Avenue to the east; 15th Street to the south; and 10th Avenue to the west Manhattan, New York City
- Coordinates: 40°44′33″N 74°0′22″W
- Architect: various
- Architectural style: various
- Part of: Gansevoort Market Historic District (ID07000487)
- Designated CP: May 30, 2007

Chelsea Market is a food hall, shopping mall, office building and television production facility located in the Chelsea neighborhood of the borough of Manhattan, in New York City. The Chelsea Market complex occupies an entire city block with a connecting bridge over Tenth Avenue to the adjacent 85 Tenth Avenue building. The High Line passes through the 10th Avenue side of the building.

Chelsea Market was constructed in the 1890s and was originally the site of the National Biscuit Company (Nabisco) factory complex where the Oreo cookie was invented and produced. The complex was redeveloped in the 1990s and features a retail concourse at ground level with office space above. Chelsea Market is currently owned by Alphabet Inc., parent company of Google. Chelsea Market lies within the Gansevoort Market Historic District, which is on the New York State and National Register of Historic Places.

== Description ==
The Chelsea Market complex fills an entire city block bounded by Ninth and Tenth Avenues and 15th and 16th Streets, with a connecting bridge over Tenth Avenue to the adjacent 85 Tenth Avenue building, which was also part of the Nabisco complex but is now separately owned. In addition to the retail concourse, it also provides standard office space for tenants, including media and broadcasting companies such as Oxygen Network, Food Network, MLB.com, BAMTech, EMI Music Publishing and the local New York City cable station NY1. More recently, Google has moved into some of the second, third, fourth, seventh, and eighth floors along with its subsidiary YouTube on the fifth.

Retail facilities were introduced into the building by connecting the original back lots of individual buildings to a central, ground-level concourse with entries at 9th and 10th Avenues (completed in April 1997 by Architect Jeff Vandeberg). Anchor stores include Pearl River Mart, Chelsea Market Baskets, Posman Books, Sarabeth's Bakery, Manhattan Fruit Exchange, MokBar, BuonItalia, Anthropologie, and the Buddakan restaurant. There is also a variety of cultures to explore including restaurants like Los Tacos No. 1, Miznon, the Fat Witch Bakery, Amy's Bread, Chelsea Wine Vault, Eleni's Bakery, Ninth Street Espresso, The Lobster Place, Dickson's Farmstand, The Green Table, Chelsea Thai and Friedman's Lunch, an Italian fresh pasta restaurant called Giovanni Rana Pastificio e Cucina, as well as a variety of smaller stores selling cheese, artisanal salt and olive oil, chocolate and flowers. In November 2015 Davidovich Bakery announced the opening of a Davidovich Bagels location at the Chelsea Market.

Morimoto, owned by Food Network "Iron Chef" Masaharu Morimoto and designed by Japanese architect Tadao Ando, opened in January 2006 and operated on the 10th Avenue side for 15 years until 2020. The Food Network used to film its shows Iron Chef America and Emeril Live in the Chelsea Market complex.

The developers of Chelsea Market encourage a symbiotic relationship among their tenants with the vendors supplying the restaurateurs with fresh ingredients, such as seafood, vegetables, fruit and meats. Chelsea Market brings diverse tenants, businesses, and vendors together that encourage tenants to foster community and cultivate business support among one another. The presence of television companies in the same building also brings media attention to the site and the businesses that are found there. The site also allows businesses to combine their manufacturing and retail assets under one roof.

The High Line, which opened in the spring of 2009, passes through the building's Tenth Avenue side. This abandoned, elevated railroad track has been converted to an urban oasis or greenway, which now forms a continuous route between the Javits Center and the Meatpacking District.

== History ==
Construction of baking facilities by local concerns at this location began in the 1890s, and merger of several companies into the National Biscuit Company (often then known as NBC) occurred in 1898. Nabisco continued to expand the facilities until the company's departure for the suburbs in 1958. The final configuration consists of 19 separate structures taking up the entire city block, and included both production areas and offices. Several decades of varying levels of occupancy and light industrial use followed Nabisco's departure as the commercial character of the neighborhood declined. Since its redevelopment by Irwin Cohen (1933–2023) with Jeff Vandeberg and Vandenberg Architects in the 1990s, the complex has featured a retail concourse at ground level with office space above, and is distinguished by its light-hearted touches and re-use of historic urban artifacts.

The majority of the original buildings consist of heavy timber wood construction with brick facades and were designed by the firm of Romeyn & Stever. There is also an interior pedestrian bridge on some upper levels to allow people to cross from the north to south sides of the courtyard. The building on the Tenth Avenue side is a later structure designed in the 1930s by Nabisco's then-architect Louis Wirsching Jr. that replaced the original baking facilities there. Its construction coincided with that of the High Line, allowing a freight train siding to be built directly within the building itself. Rail and aluminum-clad walking bridge connections were also added going across 10th Avenue to tie in the existing 85 Tenth Avenue building across the street.

Chelsea Market lies within the Gansevoort Market Historic District, which is listed on the National Register of Historic Places. It was nominated by the Greenwich Village Society for Historic Preservation, which advocated for the New York City Historic District in the Meatpacking District to include properties north to 16th Street. However, the area designated in 2003 by the New York City Landmarks Preservation Commission stops shy of 15th Street.

In 2012, then-owners Jamestown L.P. received approval to proceed with a planned 6-story office tower expansion above the western portion of the site, despite significant opposition by community and activist groups. Construction of the expansion project had not yet started as of 2014.

In 2018, Google parent company Alphabet Inc. bought Chelsea Market for more than $2.4 billion. Google owns 111 Eighth Avenue, across Ninth Avenue from Chelsea Market. Prior to the sale of the market, Google leased space in the building. The sale was described as one of the most expensive real estate transactions for a single building in history of New York City.

== Gallery ==
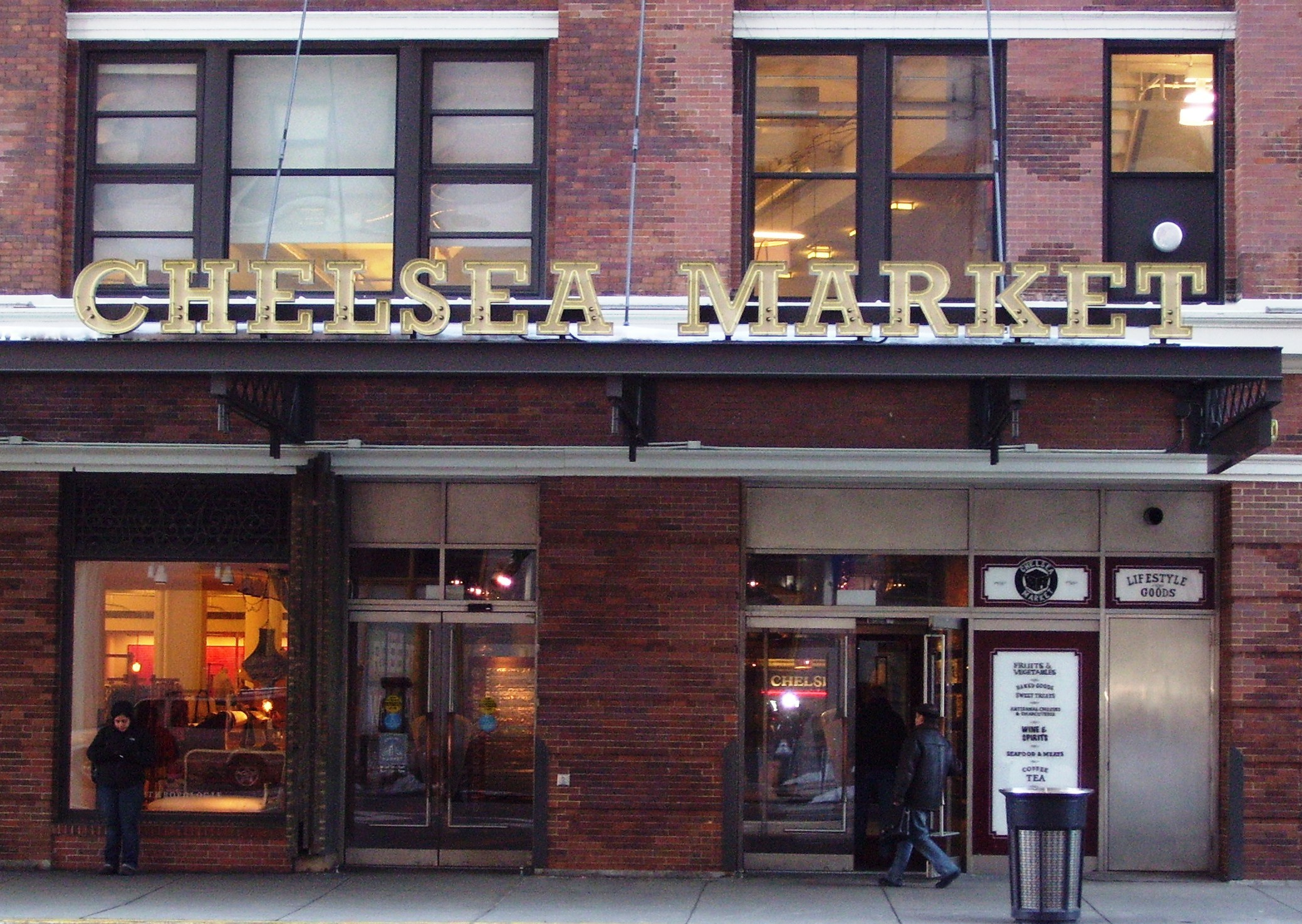
The Ninth Avenue entrance to Chelsea Market

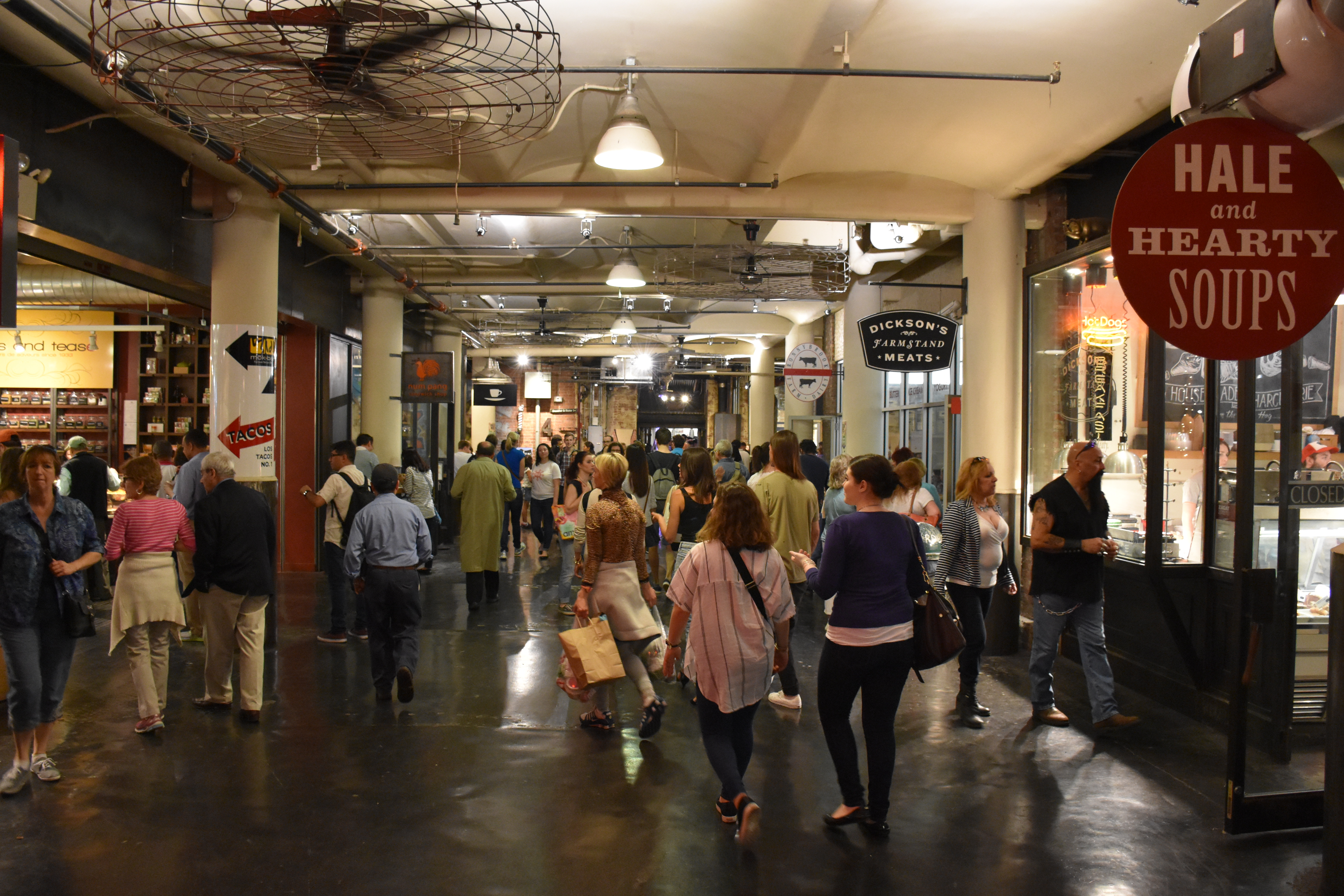
Various food establishments inside the Chelsea Market

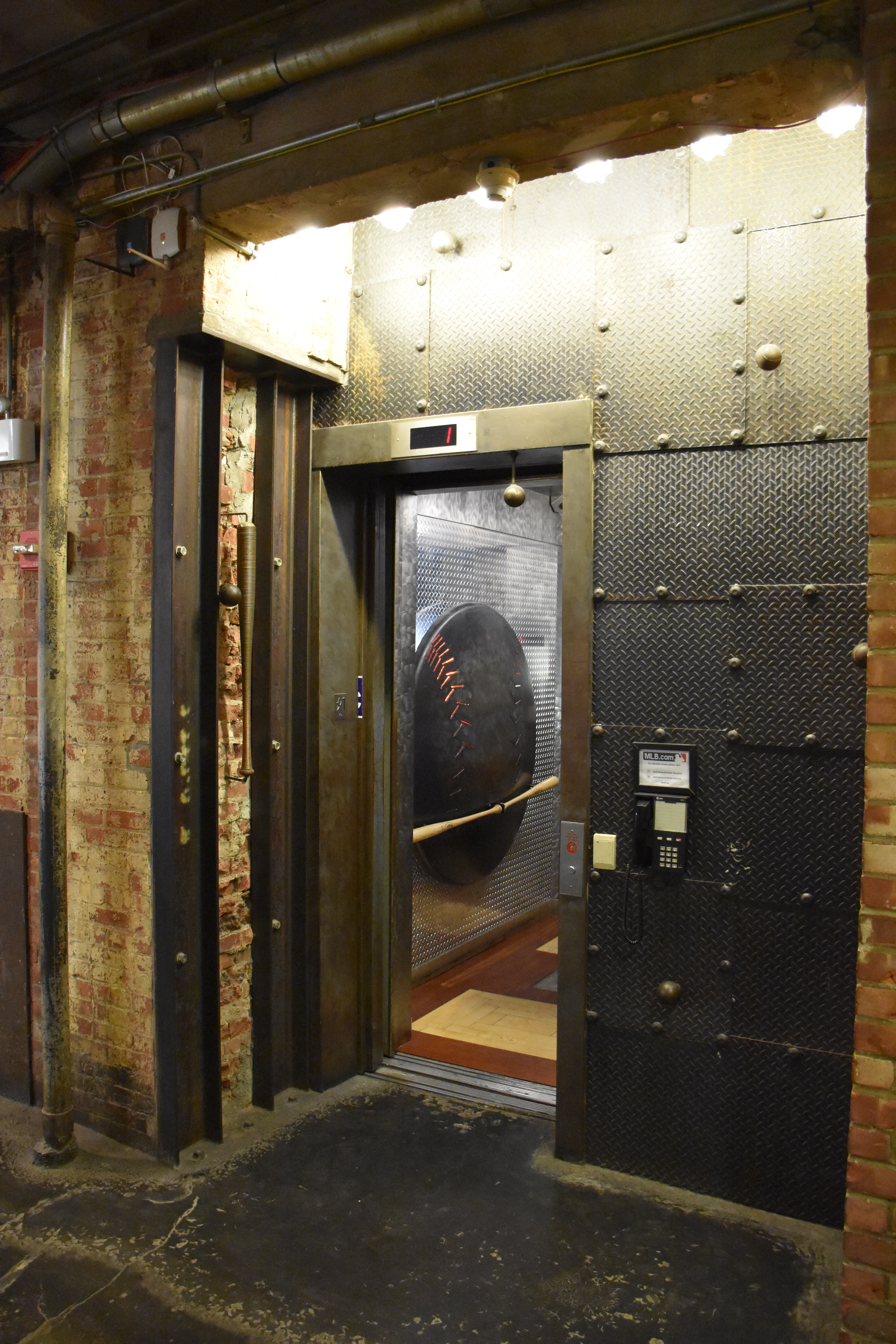
Elevator to the MLB.com offices

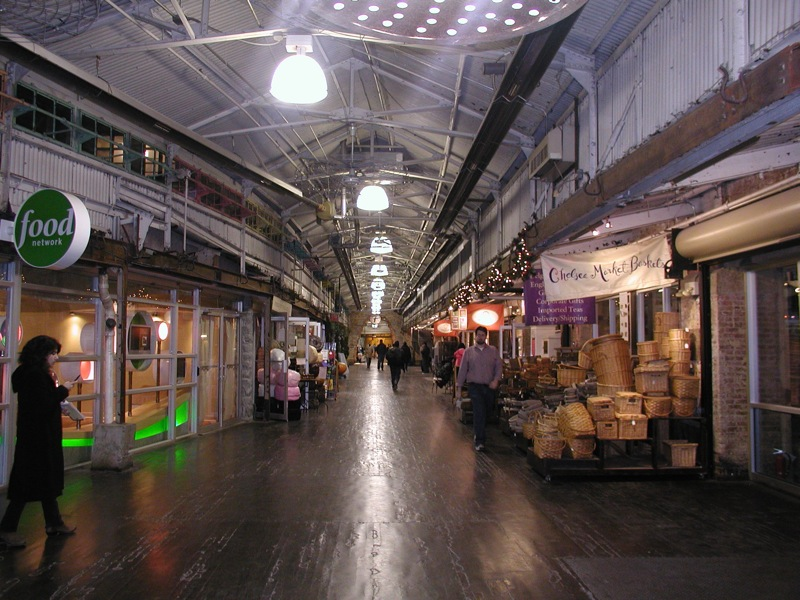
Inside the Chelsea Market

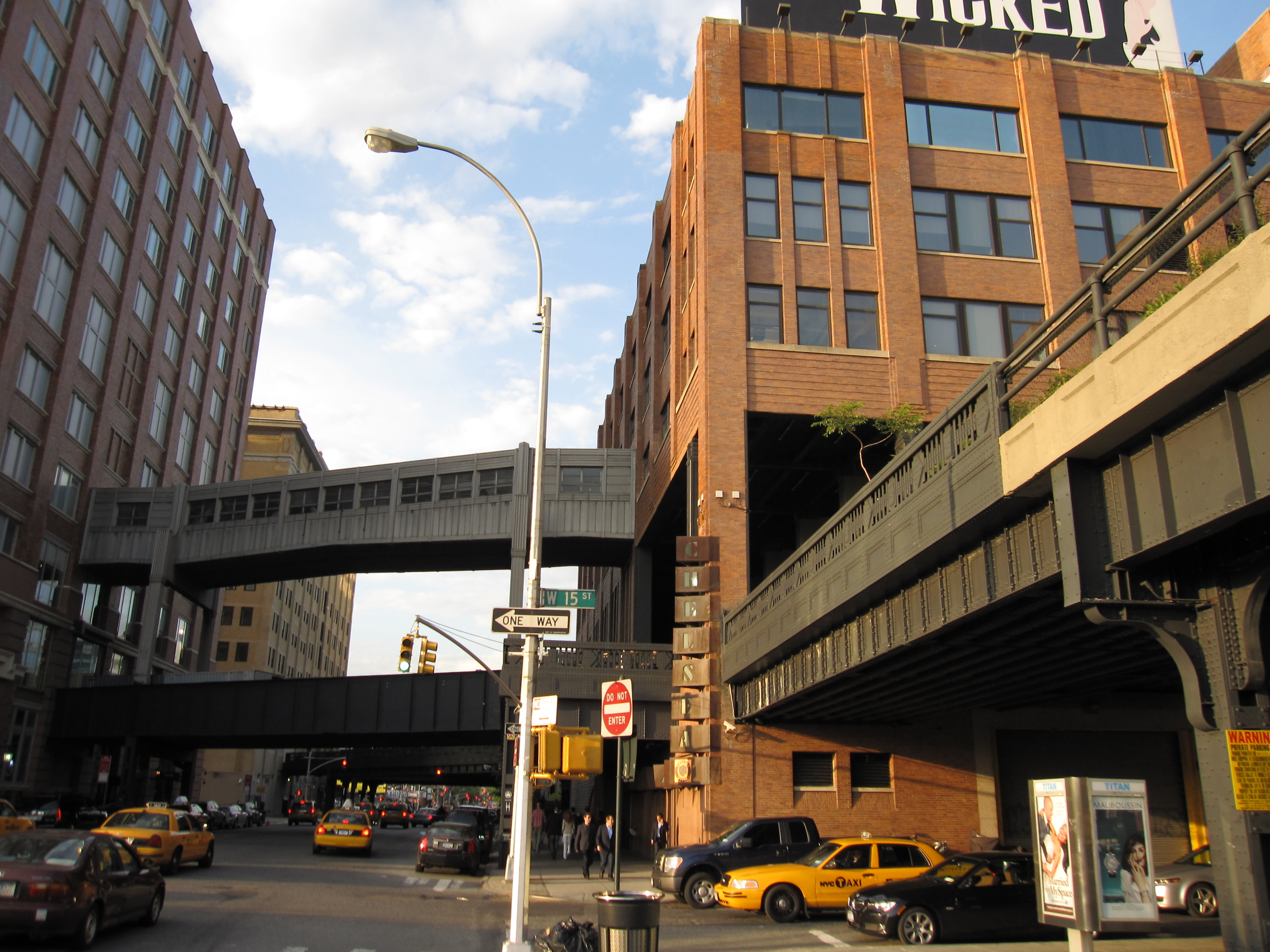
The High Line between 14th and 15th streets where the tracks run through the second floor of the Chelsea Market building, with a side track and pedestrian bridge

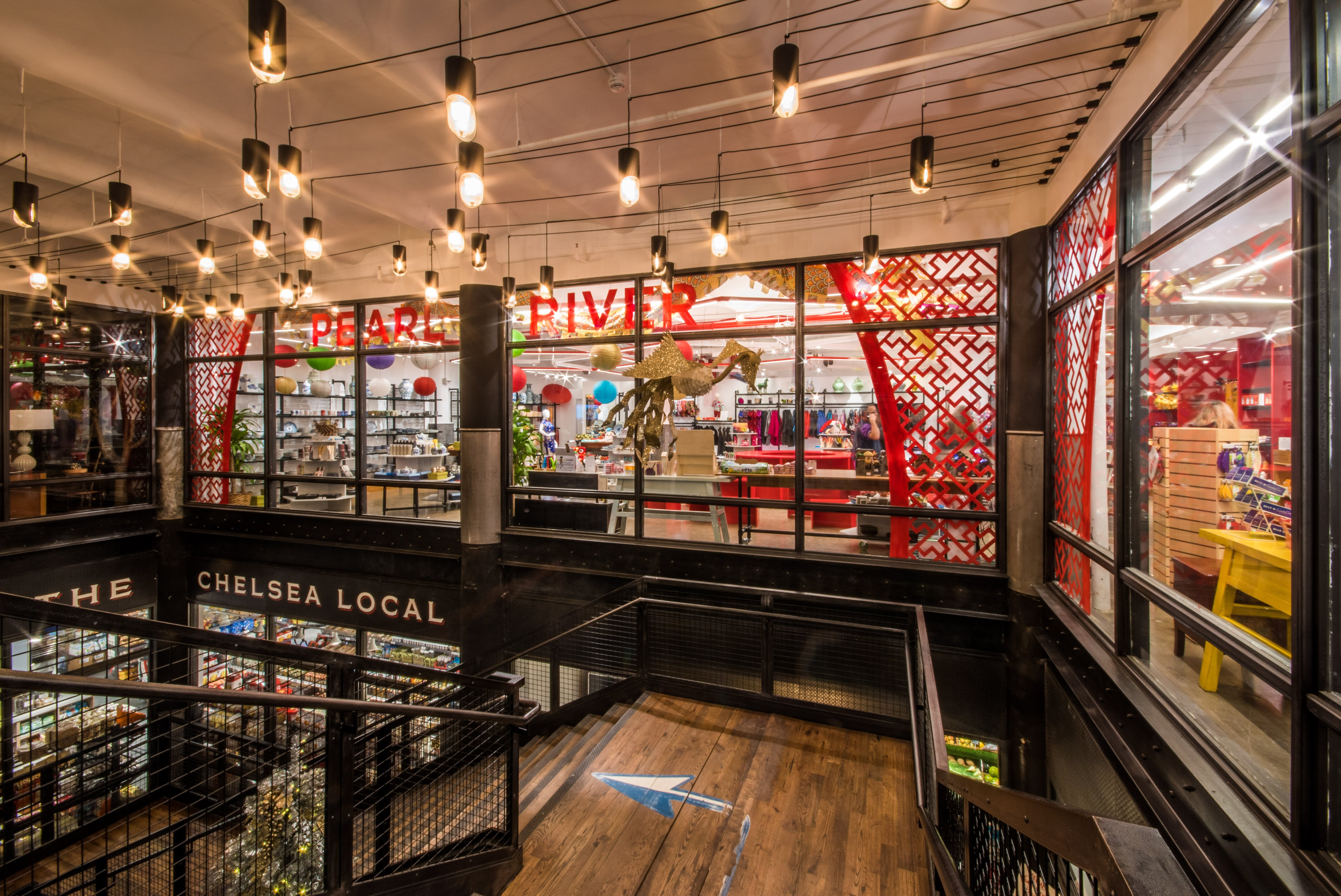
Stairs leading down to Chelsea Local featuring Pearl River Mart store
