= Van den Bergh reaction =

Chemical reaction used to measure bilirubin levels in blood

Van den Bergh reaction is a chemical reaction used to measure bilirubin levels in blood. More specifically, it determines the amount of conjugated bilirubin in the blood. The reaction produces azobilirubin. Principle: bilirubin reacts with diazotised sulphanilic acid to produce purple coloured azobilirubin. This reaction is highly useful in understanding the nature of jaundice. This was pioneered by the Dutch physician, Abraham Albert Hijmans van den Bergh (1869–1943) of Utrecht. This test helps to identify the type of jaundice. The serum of the patient is mixed with diazo reagent. If a red colour develops immediately it is called a direct positive. It happens if conjugated bilirubin is present. In an indirect positive test, the patient's serum is first treated with alcohol and later mixed with diazo reagent. This causes development of a red colour. It is seen if unconjugated bilirubin is present. If both conjugated and unconjugated bilirubin are present the reaction is termed a biphasic reaction.
