= Agnes Vanderburg =

US Native American

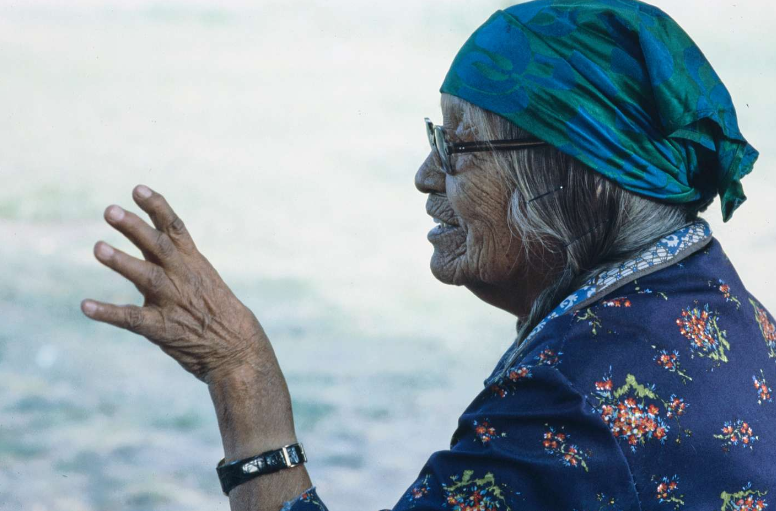
- Agnes Vanderburg in Arlee, Montana in 1979
- Born: 1901 near Arlee, Montana, U.S.
- Died: 1989 (aged 87–88)
- Occupation: teacher

Mary "Agnes" Vanderburg (1901–1989) was a Native American teacher, translator and author. She was descended from Selish Indians on the Flathead Reservation in the US state of Montana.

== Life ==
She was born near Arlee in 1901. She was descended from Salish Indians on the Flathead Reservation in the US state of Montana. In 1920 she and Jerome Stanislaus Vanderburg married and they operated a farm near Arlee. They had a son named Joe and another son Eneas was born while she and her husband were away hunting.

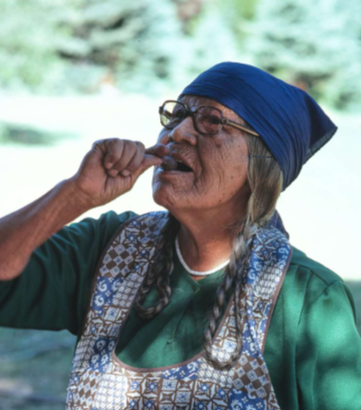
Vanderburg eating Camus root she had just cooked

Her husband died in 1974 and as a widow she began "culture camp" ( Culture Camp ) in the place where she had been born which was called Valley Creek. The camp was established in 1981 and it ran each summer and native American children would learn about their culture and traditions. The camp ran for years and it was documented by a folklorist named Kay Young who witnessed Vanderburg preparing, cooking and eating Camus roots. The cooking of the plants takes three days and skill is required to pick the plant as there is a very similar and toxic variety.

The reservation had "No Trespassing" signs but still children who were not just Native Americans were attracted to Vanderburg's tented camp. Some visitors were in Winnebagos and Vanderburg had her own trailer. Crafts would use modern glues where they were effective, but there was no running water or electricity. At the camp you could learn how to decorate buckskin and what were the traditional uses of native plants. Without advertising, she and the camp became better known.

== Awards and legacy ==
The Montana Governor's Arts Award in 1983 was given to Vanderburg in the award's Folk & Traditional Art category. The Smithsonian Institution has noted her contributions. The summer camp that she founded is now called the "Agnes Vanderburg Camp". It is organised by Salish Kootenai College as part of their courses in Native American Studies. The skills taught include basket weaving, beading, dyeing, traditional jewellery, and the manufacture of arrow heads, flutes and drums.
