= Jan van den Bergh (painter) =

Dutch painter

Jan van den Bergh (1587 in Alkmaar – 1660 in Alkmaar), was a Dutch Golden Age painter.

== Biography ==
According to Houbraken Jan was the father of the painter Mathys van den Berg who had been a pupil of Hendrick Goltzius in Haarlem until Jan, whose father was a school teacher, moved with his family to Brabant when his father was sent there. Jan went on drawing and came to make the acquaintance of Peter Paul Rubens, who became friends with him and encouraged his artistic endeavors while appointing him manager of his lands in Ypres.

According to the RKD he was a pupil of Goltzius in Haarlem and of Rubens in Antwerp. In Ypres his son (and later pupil) was born in 1615, but in 1622 he was back in Antwerp, where he took on Jan Fijt as his pupil. In 1649-1650 his name is registered in the Alkmaar Guild of St. Luke, where he took on the pupil Adriaen Jansz Decker.
