= Jeff Vandeberg =

Dutch-born American architect

Jeff Vandeberg is a Dutch-born American architect. In the early part of his career he collaborated with the heralded modernist Marcel Breuer on several noted projects including the Madison Avenue situated Whitney Museum of American Art in New York City and the Rosenberg House in East Hampton, New York. In 1972 he opened his own practice. His completed designs have included; the Providence College ice hockey rink, the Roanoke Electric Steel building, the headquarters of the Mellon Foundation and perhaps his most high profile work to date, the Chelsea Market in New York City located at the confluence of the meat packing and Chelsea neighborhoods. He is a past adjunct professor at Pratt Institute in Brooklyn.
