= Matthias Jansz van den Bergh =

Dutch Golden Age painter

Matthias Jansz. van den Bergh (1618–1687) was a Dutch Golden Age painter.

According to Houbraken, his father Jan van den Bergh was a painter from Alkmaar in the service of Rubens in Ypres, where Matthias was born. Houbraken claimed Jan van den Berg had been a pupil of Hendrick Goltzius before moving to Brabant and later working for Rubens. Young Matthias learned to paint from his father and went to work in Rubens' workshop.

According to the RKD he was in Rubens' workshop from 1630 to 1640 and in 1635 was either his pupil or was otherwise employed in his workshop. In 1646 he became a member of the Alkmaar Guild of St. Luke. He lived in Leiden from 1648 until 1651, and was back in Alkmaar from then onwards, where he is recorded in 1656 as living in the Lombardsteeg. He painted portraits, soldiers, and historical allegories, and is not to be confused with the contemporary Delft painter Mattheus Gillisz van den Berch (c1608–1687).
