= Abraham Albert Hijmans van den Bergh =

Dutch physician

Albert Abraham Hijmans van den Bergh
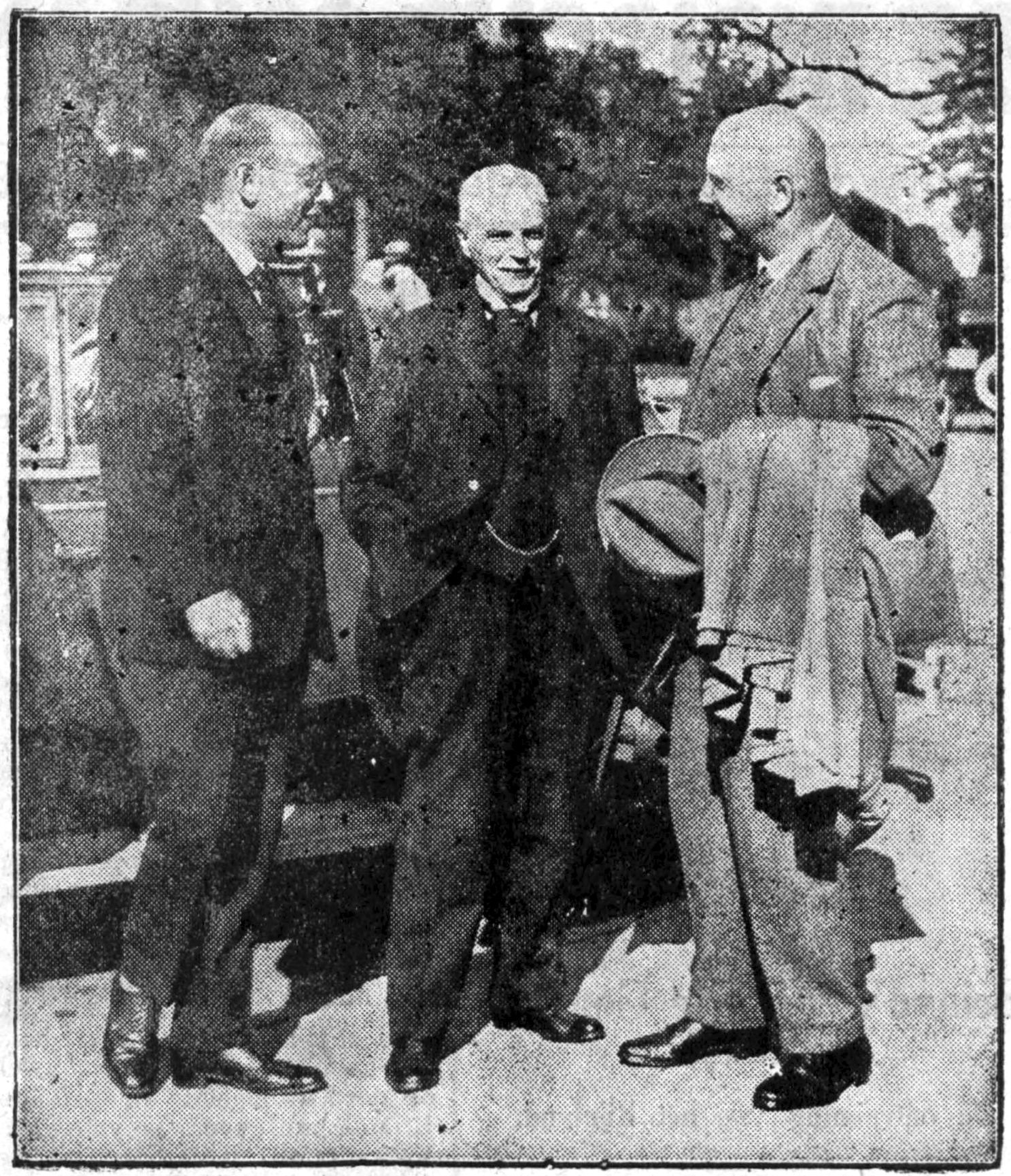
- Hijmans van den Bergh (in the middle)
- Born: 1 December 1869; Rotterdam
- Died: 28 September 1943 (aged 73); Utrecht
- Known for: Van den Bergh reaction
- Scientific career
- Fields: Medicine

Abraham Albert Hijmans van den Bergh (1 December 1869, in Rotterdam – 28 September 1943, in Utrecht) was a Dutch physician specializing in internal medicine. Hijmans van den Bergh is best known for his Van den Bergh reaction.

In 1919 he became member of the Royal Netherlands Academy of Arts and Sciences.

Hijmans van den Bergh was of Jewish descent, but neither he or his parents were religiously observant, nor members of a Jewish worship community. Later in life he joined the Remonstrant Church. His final years were spent under the German occupation of the Netherlands; he was spared persecution due to being in a "mixed marriage".
