= Dirk van der Berg =

South African cricketer

Personal information
- Full name: Dirk Pieter van der Berg
- Born: 2 March 1962 (age 64); Virginia, Orange Free State, South Africa
- Batting: Right-handed
- Bowling: Right-arm off spin

Domestic team information
- Years: Team
- 1992: Orange Free State Country Districts

Career statistics
Competition	List A
Matches	1
Runs scored	0
Batting average	0.00
100s/50s	0/0
Top score	0
Balls bowled	12
Wickets	0
Bowling average	–
5 wickets in innings	–
10 wickets in match	–
Best bowling	–
Catches/stumpings	0/–
- Source: CricketArchive, 6 April 2015

Dirk Pieter van der Berg (born 2 March 1967) is a former South African cricketer who was active during the early 1990s.

Born in Virginia, a gold mining town in Orange Free State Province, van der Berg's sole recorded match came for an Orange Free State Country Districts side during the 1992–93 South African season. Played in early October 1992, the game came during that season's edition of the Total Power Series, a limited-overs knockout competition which, from the 1989–90 season, had included "country districts" sides in the first round in order to bolster the number of teams. Orange Free State Country Districts met Northern Transvaal in the first round, in what was to be the side's only match at List-A level. With his side batting first, van der Berg was dismissed for a duck coming in third in the batting order, bowled by a future South African ODI player, Mike Rindel. He bowled two overs of right-arm off spin in Northern Transvaal's innings, as they went on to win easily, by eight wickets.
