= Emily Dubberley =

British author and journalist

- Born: 1974 (age 51–52); Cheltenham
- Occupations: Author and journalist
- Website: www.dubberley.com

Emily Dubberley (born 1974) is a British author and journalist specialising in sex and relationships. She founded women's sex website Cliterati in 2001 and went on to found Scarlet magazine in September 2004, editing the first ten issues before becoming editor-at-large. She has written 24 internationally selling books since 2004.

== Career ==
Dubberley studied Social Psychology at Loughborough University, specialising in sexuality and covering topics including male and female attitudes to pornography and whether women want their sexual fantasies to come true. She was also sabbatical editor of the Students' Union newspaper and the founder of the Freefest Student Union music festival.

She spent the first decade of her career in the marketing industry, helping found the Student Broadcast Network, and becoming marketing manager for the Barfly group.

After being shortlisted for the Cosmopolitan Journalism Scholarship, and the Company Fiction Writer Award, she founded Cliterati in 2001, a text-based sex website for women offering erotica, advice and features. She has subsequently been nominated for three Erotic Awards: Best Campaigner; Best Book (Brief Encounters: The Woman's Guide to Casual Sex) and Best Film (Lover's Guide 3D).

Dubberley was founding editor of Scarlet, a sex magazine for women that launched in September 2004. She has written for numerous publications including More, New Woman, Elle, Men's Health, Forum, The Guardian, Penthouse, The Star and Glamour, and has had articles syndicated worldwide. She was heavily involved with a writer's website, abctales, which launched in around 2000.

She wrote the five most recent Lovers' Guide videos, edited the Lovers' Guide magazine and helped create loversguide.com. She also wrote for the Joan Rivers Position on Channel 5. Throughout 2006 she wrote and presented a monthly podcast show Sex Talk With Emily Dubberley for Audible.co.uk, which she followed with a series of erotic anthologies. Dubberley was also editor of EK (Erotic Knave) magazine and sex agony aunt for Look magazine for five years.

Currently, Dubberley runs urban gardening website Groweatgift.com and arts and science organisation Forestofthoughts.co.uk, helps organise Brighton Science Festival, is a freelance journalist and writes fiction and non-fiction books. In 2008, after her mother's successful treatment for breast cancer, Dubberley created Burlesque Against Breast Cancer, a charity campaign seeking to raise money for Macmillan Cancer Support. The BABC programme includes Ultimate Burlesque, an erotic anthology co-edited by Dubberley and Alyson Fixter and published by Xcite Books, and a burlesque fundraising ball held in Brighton in November 2008. This was followed by a new anthology, Ultimate Decadence, again co-edited by Dubberley with Alyson Fixter and Sarah Berry, and published by Xcite Books. Recently Xcite has been involved with a gaming network and group. He can be found not only publishing the latest pornographic literature, but online playing Arma 3.

On 1 July 2011, she appeared on This Morning defending erotica from journalist, Samantha Brick in light of the popularity of 50 Shades of Grey. She won the debate with 87% of the viewer vote, arguing "One of the advantages of erotica is that it can help spread a safer sex message. It's about education. BDSM isn't to be taken lightly but then, neither is any other kind of sex."

In 2012, she updated Cliterati.co.uk, introducing new columnists including Dr Malcolm VandenBurg, Susan Quilliam (co-author of the Joy of Sex) and Ophelia Bitz (founder of controversial cabaret collective and events organisation, ArtWank!)The new site expanded content to include reviews, news and events, science, style, history and culture alongside the features, advice and erotic stories. The site remains free.

== List of works ==
=== Books ===
- The Lovers' Guide Lovemaking Deck (Connections, 2004)
- Brief Encounters: The Women's Guide to Casual Sex (Fusion Press, 2005)
- Things a Woman Should Know About Seduction (Carlton, 2005)
- Sex Play (Connections, 2005)
- You Must be My Best Friend Because I Hate You (Fusion, 2005)
- Sex for Busy People (Fireside, 2006)
- Whip Your Life into Shape: The Dominatrix Principle (Andrews McMeel, 2006)
- I'd Rather Be Single Than Settle (Fusion, 2006)
- More Sex Play (Connections, 2006)
- The Ex Factor (Fusion, 2007)
- The Good Fantasy Guide (Prospero Books, 2007)
- True Passion: A Tale of Desire As Told To Madame B (Ebury, 2007)
- Girlfriends: The Art of Women Loving Women (Hollan, 2008)
- Ultimate Burlesque (co-edited with Alyson Fixter) (Xcite Books, 2008)
- The Good Going Down Guide (with Al Needham) (Macmillan, 2008)
- Bound to Please (Connections, 2009)
- Fantasy Sex (Connections, 2009)
- Friendly Fetish (Piatkus, 2009)
- Ultimate Decadence (co-edited with Alyson Fixter and Sarah Berry) (Xcite Books, 2009)
- Hot Sex (Connections, 2010)
- The Seduction Box (Connections, 2010)
- Arousal (Connections, 2011)
- The Field Guide to F*cking: A Hands-on Reference to Finding Great Sex (Quayside, 2012)
- Acrobatic Sex: Moves So Crazy, We Dare You to Try Them (Quayside, 2012)
- Garden of Desires: The Evolution of Women's Sexual Fantasies (Black Lace, 2013)

=== DVDs ===
- Lovers' Guide: Sexual Positions
- Lovers' Guide: Sex Play
- Lovers Guide: Satisfaction Guaranteed, 7 Secrets to a Passionate Love Life
- Lovers Guide: Interactive
- The Lovers' Guide 3D - Igniting Desire: How to have the best sex of your life

=== Podcasts ===
- Sex Talk With Emily Dubberley
- Dark Desires: A Collection of Erotic Stories
- A Little Bit More: A Collection of Erotic Stories
- Sapphic Seduction: A Collection of Erotic Stories
- Stranger Than Fiction: A Collection of Erotic Stories
- Vanilla Daydreams: A Collection of Erotic Stories
