= Pieter Daniel van der Burgh =

Dutch landscape painter

- Born: 9 November 1805; The Hague
- Died: 26 July 1879 (aged 73); Rijswijk

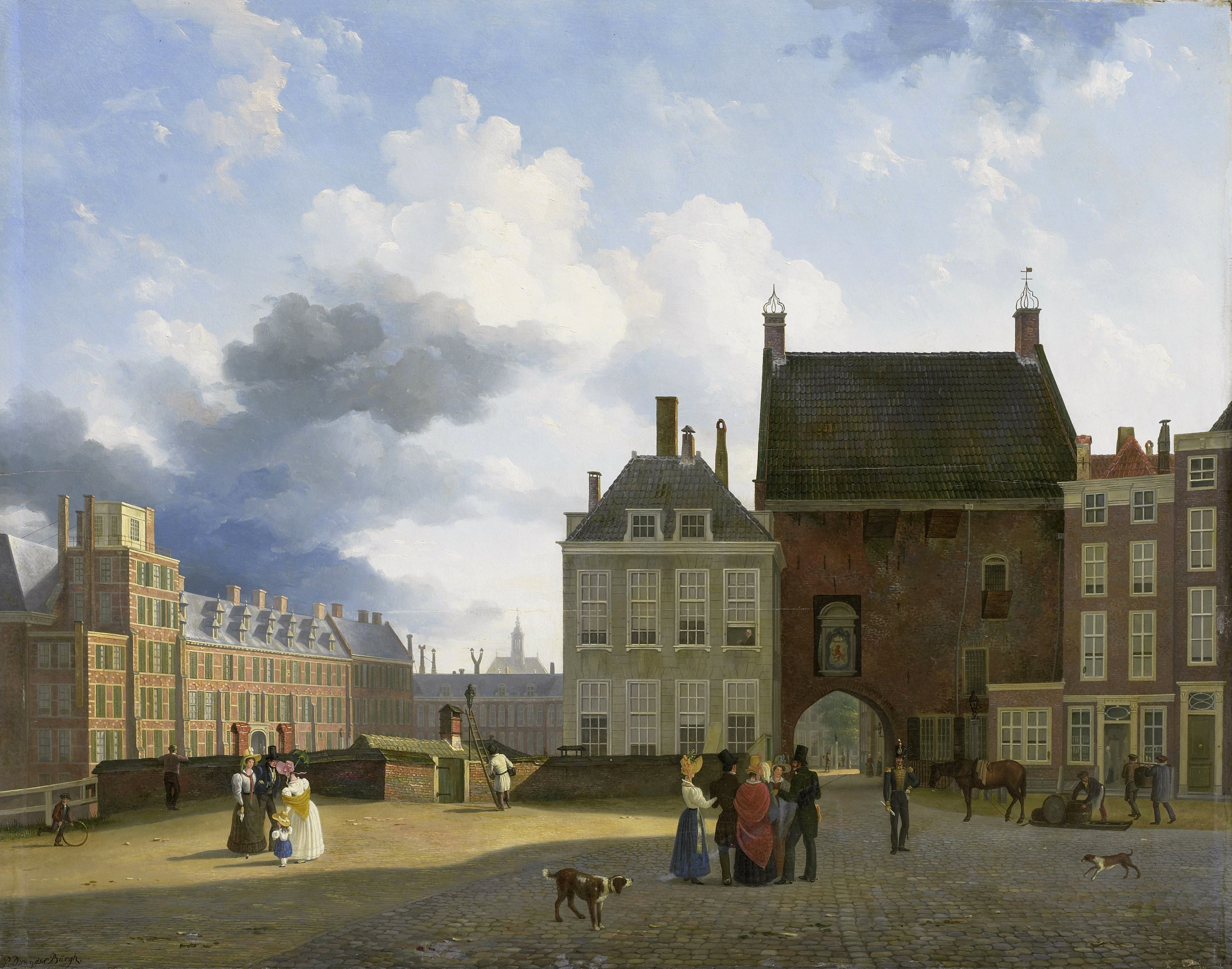
The Gevangenpoort in The Hague, c. 1850

Pieter Daniel van der Burgh or P. D. van der Burgh (1805–1879) was a Dutch landscape painter.

He was a pupil of his father, Hendrik van der Burgh (1769–1858). He is known for landscapes, but also made portraits and still life paintings.
