= G. Van Den Burgh =

Indonesian footballer

Personal information
- Place of birth: Dutch East Indies
- Position: Midfielder

Senior career*
Years	Team	Apps	(Gls)
- SVV Semarang

International career
- Dutch East Indies
- * Club domestic league appearances and goals

G. van den Burgh was an Indonesian football midfielder who played for the Dutch East Indies in the 1938 FIFA World Cup. He also played for SVV Semarang. Van den Burgh is deceased.
