= Gerard van den Berg (television presenter) =

Dutch radio and television presenter (1932–2009)

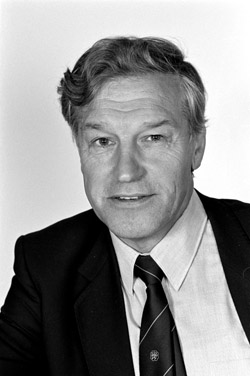
- Van den Berg in 1988
- Born: Gerard Johannes Nicolaas van den Berg; 7 December 1932; Vlaardingen, Netherlands
- Died: 7 August 2009 (aged 76); Barneveld, Netherlands
- Citizenship: Dutch
- Occupations: Radio presenter; Television presenter

Gerard Johannes Nicolaas van den Berg (7 December 1932 – 7 August 2009) was a Dutch radio and television presenter.

== Early life ==
Van den Berg was the son of Harrie van den Berg, co-founder and treasurer of VV Zwaluwen, and Cornelia van den Berg-Akkerman, writer of some 50 children's books and founder/president of a large women's association. Van den Berg was the middle brother of three sons and had two sisters. In the Historical Yearbook Vlaardingen of 1985, he wrote about his experiences in the Second World War, stating that his love for radio was probably born during this period.

== Career ==
Van den Berg began his career in the daily press, working as a reporter for Attentie, the current affairs section of the NCRV, and also in programs, such as Hier en nu and Memo. In 1966, he became the first press officer for the municipality of Groningen, where he worked closely with Mayor Berger. After that, in 1970, he returned to the NCRV.

On the radio, Van den Berg started the popular program "Who knows where Willem Wever lives?" in 1977. Other programs he presented were "The Word-in-Image Quiz" (1981) and Away from the Highway (1987 to 1989). In addition, he was a presenter on the radio programs Maandagmorgen Magazine, VIP Roem, NCRV Globaal, Middenin, and Als de dag van toen. From 1986 onwards, Van den Berg also presented Met het oog op morgen with some regularity. In April 1974, following some statements averse to women's emancipation, he was awarded the mocking title of 'Man of the Month' by VARA viewers. In 1987, he left the NCRV radio, only to return later.

In July 1992, famous Dutch people had to guess who was not the real son of Gerard van den Berg in an anniversary episode of "Like Father, Like Son".

== Death ==
Gerard van den Berg died on 7 August 2009, at the age of 76, after a short illness.
