= Malcolm VandenBurg =

English doctor, specialising in sexual health, stress management and legal issues

Malcolm VandenBurg is a British doctor involved in drug research, sexual health, medicolegal advice and stress management.

== Medical career ==
VandenBurg qualified in St Bartholomew's Hospital in 1973 with a BSc in Physiology.

He lectured in medicine, as an Honorary Senior Registrar at the London Hospital and as an Honorary Lecturer in Clinical Pharmacology at St Bartholomew's Hospital

VandenBurg is a Fellow of the Royal College of Physicians, the American College of Clinical Pharmacology and the Faculty of Pharmaceutical Medicine

He established the London Hospital Hypertension Clinic in 1975.

== Research ==
VandenBurg was director of cardiovascular research, Old Church Hospital Romford (1984–1996) and director of clinical research at Merck Sharpe & Dohme (1980–1984)

In 1996 he was appointed president and chief executive officer of global research consultancy IBRD – Rostrum Inc.

VandenBurg has coordinated drug development programmes for over 30 pharmaceutical products and has over 100 publications in the field of clinical research.

== Medicolegal Work ==
VandenBurg is a registered expert witness who has given medicolegal advice to courts, authorities and media in a number of high-profile cases.

He has written in the BMJ about the medicolegal implications of newer SSRIs and of driving while under the influence of cannabis

VandenBurg was an expert witness in the case of the Death of Sean Rigg in police custody in 2008. He also advised the Northern Ireland Prisoner Ombudsman on the deaths of Aaron Hogg in Maghaberry Prison in 2011. and Frances McKeown in Hydebank Wood Prison, both in 2011.

VandenBurg advised the UK press on the use of propofol in the Death of Michael Jackson.

== Key Publications ==
- Johnson, P; Andrews, DC; Wells, S; De Lusignan, S; Robinson, J; Vandenburg, M (2001). "The use of a new continuous wireless cardiorespiratory telemonitoring system by elderly patients at home". Journal of Telemedicine and Telecare. 7 Suppl 1 (5): 76–7. doi:10.1258/1357633011936831. PMID 11576502.
- Dews, I; Vandenburg, M (2001). "A 24-week dose-titration study of the angiotensin-converting enzyme inhibitor imidapril in the treatment of mild-to-moderate essential hypertension in the elderly". The Journal of International Medical Research. 29 (2): 100–7. doi:10.1177/147323000102900206. PMID 11393342. S2CID 25326174.
- Vandenburg, MJ; Mackay, EM; Dews, I; Pullan, T; Brugier, S (March 1994). "Dose finding studies with imidapril--a new ACE inhibitor". British Journal of Clinical Pharmacology. 37 (3): 265–72. doi:10.1111/j.1365-2125.1994.tb04274.x. PMC 1364758. PMID 8198936.
- Vandenburg, MJ; Allen, ME (January 1994). "Good clinical practice--a question of balance". British Journal of Clinical Pharmacology. 37 (1): 101–2. doi:10.1111/j.1365-2125.1994.tb04250.x. PMC 1364721. PMID 8148212.
- Vandenburg, MJ; Stephens, JD; Resplandy, G; Dews, IM; Robinson, J; Desche, P (February 1993). "Digoxin pharmacokinetics and perindopril in heart failure patients". Journal of Clinical Pharmacology. 33 (2): 146–9. doi:10.1002/j.1552-4604.1993.tb03935.x. PMID 8440763. S2CID 31434688.
- Allen, ME; Vandenburg, MJ (May 1992). "Good clinical practice: rules, regulations and their impact on the investigator". British Journal of Clinical Pharmacology. 33 (5): 463–5. doi:10.1111/j.1365-2125.1992.tb04071.x. PMC 1381430. PMID 1524957.
- Wight, LJ; VandenBurg, MJ; Potter, CE; Freeth, CJ (1992). "A large scale comparative study in general practice with nitroglycerin spray and tablet formulations in elderly patients with angina pectoris". European Journal of Clinical Pharmacology. 42 (3): 341–2. doi:10.1007/bf00266360. PMID 1577055. S2CID 6916899.
- Dews, IM; VandenBurg, MJ; Pullan, TR (December 1991). "A randomized crossover study of the blood pressure effects of tobacco and non-tobacco cigarettes". Journal of Hypertension Supplement. 9 (6): S120–1. doi:10.1097/00004872-199112006-00044. PMID 1818907.
- Robinson, P; Vandenburg, M; Dews, I (2 November 1991). "Informed consent". BMJ (Clinical Research Ed.). 303 (6810): 1138. doi:10.1136/bmj.303.6810.1138. PMC 1671252. PMID 1747598.
- Dews, IM; Vandenburg, MJ (13 April 1991). "Preventing fraud". BMJ (Clinical Research Ed.). 302 (6781): 907. doi:10.1136/bmj.302.6781.907-a. PMC 1669231. PMID 1859564.
- Walker, JW; VandenBurg, MJ; Currie, WJ (1984). "Differential efficacy of two non-steroidal anti-inflammatory drugs in the treatment of sports injuries". Current Medical Research and Opinion. 9 (2): 119–23. doi:10.1185/03007998409109569. PMID 6544198.
- Hayes, TB; Fyvie, A; Janke, PG; Vandenburg, MJ; Currie, WJ (March 1984). "Sulindac versus ibuprofen in sprains and strains". British Journal of Sports Medicine. 18 (1): 30–3. doi:10.1136/bjsm.18.1.30. PMC 1858854. PMID 6372927.
- Cooper, WD; Currie, WJ; Vandenburg, MJ (March 1983). "The influence of physicians' instructions on the outcome of antihypertensive therapy". The British Journal of Clinical Practice. 37 (3): 99–103. PMID 6882631.

== Books ==
- Positive Under Pressure jointly authored with Gael Lindenfield, published by Avenue Books (24 April 2006)
- Dilemmas and Solutions in Global Drug Development, published by Brookwood Medical Publications (January 2003)
- Good Clinical Practice for Investigators, ROSTRUM Publications (July 1990)
