= Hyperbilirubinemia in adults =

Clinical condition in adults

Hyperbilirubinemia is a clinical condition describing an elevation of blood bilirubin level due to the inability to properly metabolise or excrete bilirubin, a product of erythrocytes breakdown. In severe cases, it is manifested as jaundice, the yellowing of tissues like skin and the sclera when excess bilirubin deposits in them. The US records 52,500 jaundice patients annually. By definition, bilirubin concentration of greater than 3 mg/dL is considered hyperbilirubinemia, following which jaundice progressively develops and becomes apparent when plasma levels reach 20 mg/dL. Rather than a disease itself, hyperbilirubinemia is indicative of multifactorial underlying disorders that trace back to deviations from regular bilirubin metabolism. Diagnosis of hyperbilirubinemia depends on physical examination, urinalysis, serum tests, medical history and imaging to identify the cause. Genetic diseases, alcohol, pregnancy and hepatitis viruses affect the likelihood of hyperbilirubinemia. Causes of hyperbilirubinemia mainly arise from the liver. These include haemolytic anaemias, enzymatic disorders, liver damage and gallstones. Hyperbilirubinemia itself is often benign. Only in extreme cases does kernicterus, a type of brain injury, occur. Therapy for adult hyperbilirubinemia targets the underlying diseases but patients with jaundice often have poor outcomes.

== Bilirubin Metabolism ==
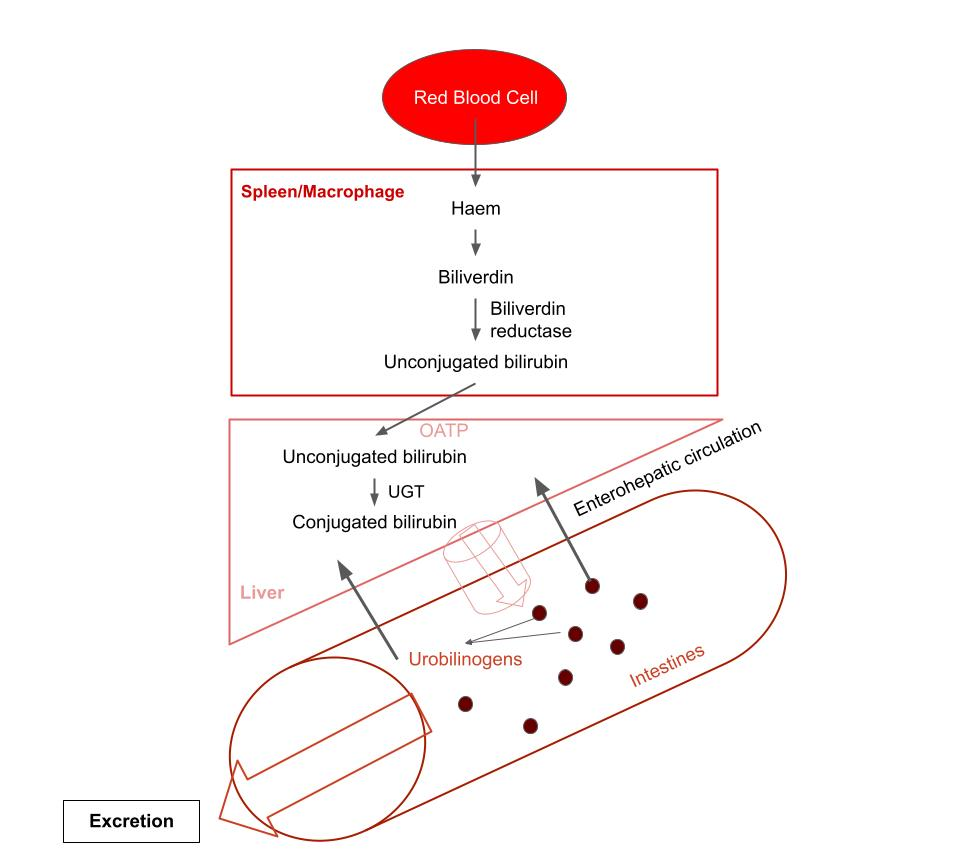
Bilirubin metabolism. Haem is converted into unconjugated bilirubin then conjugated bilirubin. Conjugated bilirubin is then secreted along with bile into the intestine and is either excreted in faeces as urobilinogen or reabsorbed into blood and transported back to the liver.

The varied causes of hyperbilirubinemia are best understood from bilirubin metabolism.

The total average daily production of bilirubin in humans is 4 mg/kg. 80% of which is derived from haemoglobin (Hb) produced by erythrocyte breakdown, with the remaining from heme proteins, like myoglobin and cytochrome, turnover. Hb is broken down into globin and haem, which then undergoes a multi-step enzymatic degradation process. After two reactions converting Hb into bilirubin IX-alpha, this unconjugated bilirubin is released into the bloodstream, where it binds reversibly with plasma protein albumin and dissociates to be taken up by liver cells through organic anion transport proteins (OATPs) on cell membranes. Inside hepatocytes, bilirubin is conjugated through uridine diphosphate-glucuronosyl-transferase (UGT) to form bilirubin diglucuronide, otherwise termed conjugated bilirubin, which is transported across the plasma membrane by multidrug resistant-associated protein 2 (MRP2) to finally enter bile capillaries. From there, conjugated bilirubin is secreted into the small intestine with bile where a portion is reabsorbed and cycled back to the liver. Unabsorbed bilirubin reaches the colon to be hydrolysed and reduced into urobilinogen that is excreted in faeces.

== Diagnosis ==
Classification and diagnosis of the underlying disease of hyperbilirubinemia are crucial for prescription of treatment.

Physical examination reviews clinical symptoms like degree of jaundice, vital signs and sensations of pain, further followed by urine tests, blood analysis and imaging. The degree of yellowish staining of the conjunctiva and skin in jaundice is proportional to hyperbilirubinemia to some extent. Vital signs, such as fever, tachycardia and hypotension, suggest hyperbilirubinemia induced by viral hepatitis. Abdominal pain could indicate biliary tract obstruction and cirrhosis.

Urinalysis serves as a first-line diagnostic tool. Conjugated bilirubin, being water-soluble, is excreted through urine. Hence, dark urine tested bilirubin positive signifies conjugated hyperbilirubinemia.

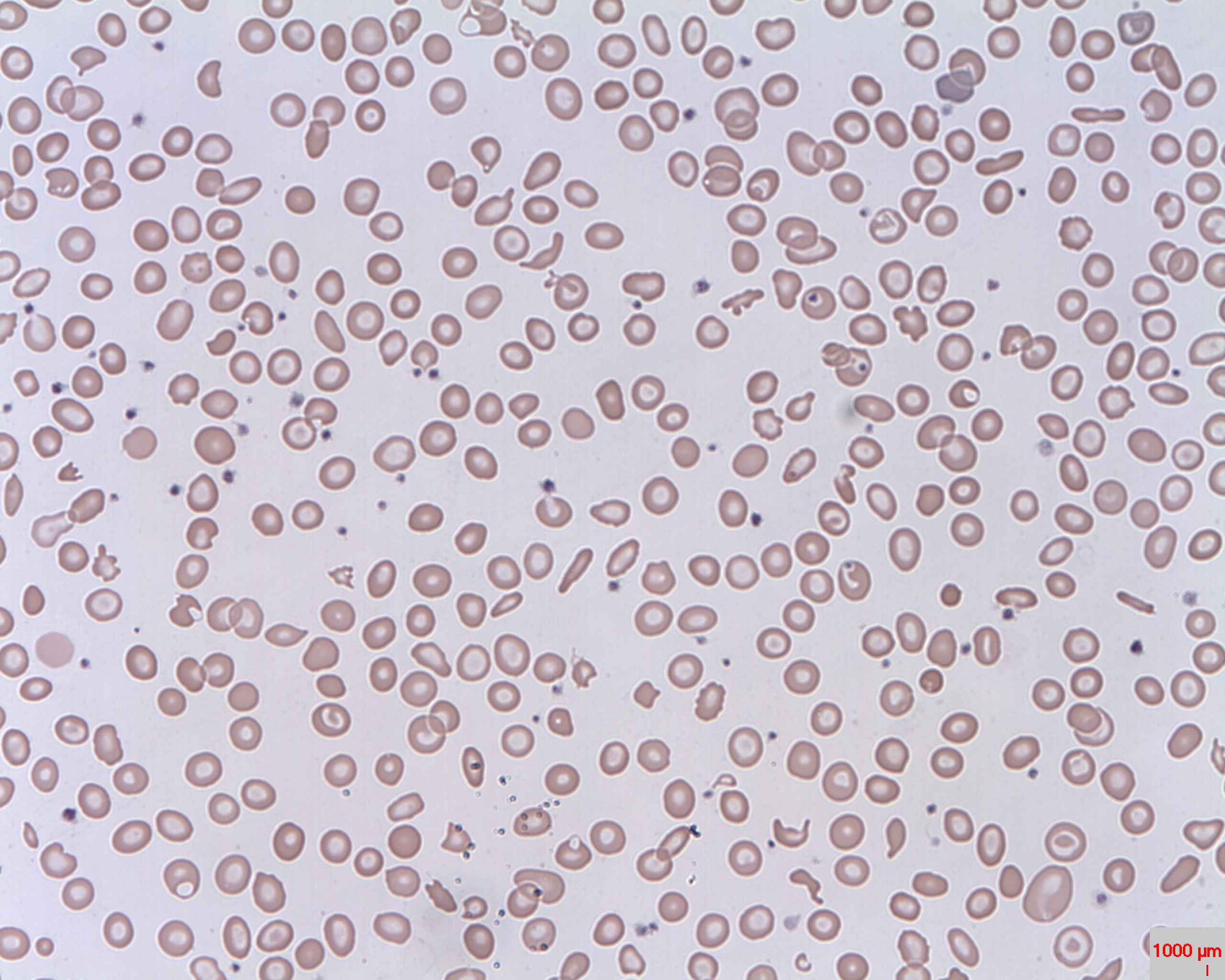
A peripheral blood smear showing signs of haemolysis. Red blood cells are normally in a biconcave shape (round cells in this picture). Schistocytes are fragmented cells resulting from intravascular destruction with shapes that differ from the normal round red blood cells.

Serum tests evaluate plasma bilirubin, haemolysis and liver function and are essential for definitive diagnosis. When total serum bilirubin exceeds 2.5 mg/dL and unconjugated bilirubin occupies >85% of total amount, it is classified as unconjugated hyperbilirubinemia. A complete blood cell count illustrating decreased fraction of intact erythrocytes signifies haemolysis, hinting for haemolytic diseases. Other than haemolysis, hepatocellular injury suggestive of liver diseases like hepatitis can be inferred through increased plasma concentration of aminotransferases AST and ALT, enzyme markers of liver function.

Apart from physical status, medical, drug, family and social history rule out unrelated diseases and give direction to further tests. Reviewing medical history enables screening for causative diseases, such as hepatobiliary diseases, hepatitis and virus infections while drug history reflects toxin exposure and drug-use-enhanced liver injuries. Intra-family recurrent liver disorders give clues to genetic mutations hence hyperbilirubinemia-associated congenital diseases. Social factors like alcohol intake and sexual history are also considered.

Upon preliminary diagnosis, imaging is ordered to investigate suspected biliary obstruction or liver damage. Right-upper quadrant ultrasound is adopted primarily for its high sensitivity and specificity in detecting gallstones and biliary damage. Pancreatic abnormalities are assessed through computed tomography (CT) and magnetic resonance imaging (MRI) whereas liver biopsy is best-suited for intrahepatic diseases.

== Risk factors ==
Risk factors of hyperbilirubinemia vary depending on its pathophysiology.

Genetic diseases and chemicals that hinder hepatic uptake of bilirubin, increase the bilirubin synthesis rate or decrease the bilirubin conjugation rate are risk factors of hyperbilirubinemia. Examples of drugs include rifampin, sulfa drug and ethinyl estradiol respectively.

Alcohol significantly increases risk of hyperbilirubinemia through causing liver damage that hinders bilirubin uptake and metabolism. Long-term heavy alcohol consumption induces steatosis and hepatitis, possibly progressing to cirrhosis. As alcohol is degraded, fat globules accumulate in liver tissues and gradually develop into steatosis. Toxic metabolites of alcohol also injure liver tissues and lead to liver inflammation called hepatitis. Such damage-repair cycles of liver tissues eventually result in cirrhosis, in which functional cells are replaced by nonfunctional scar tissues. These conditions, collectively named chronic alcoholic liver diseases, are observed in patients with daily alcohol consumption of 56-70g over 10 years. Meanwhile, acute alcoholic hepatitis may develop with the same amount of alcohol intake within 2 hours, inducing acute hyperbilirubinemia.

Another risk factor for hyperbilirubinemia is pregnancy. Gallstones are more common in pregnant women due to elevated hormones and cholesterol levels, which block the bile duct and obstruct bilirubin excretion. Besides, preeclampsia and eclampsia, denoted by high blood pressure, are linked to hyperbilirubinemia through damaging highly perfused organs, particularly liver and kidneys. Finally, acute fatty liver of pregnancy caused by mitochondrial dysfunction leads to liver insufficiency. All three conditions induce hyperbilirubinemia similarly by diminishing liver function and consequently, bilirubin metabolism.

Hepatic viral infection may cause acute and chronic hyperbilirubinemia. Hepatitis A virus causes self-limited acute hepatitis. Hepatitis B and C have similar symptoms as hepatitis A but onsets later when the stage reaches chronic liver cirrhosis. Hepatitis D virus, as a satellite virus, can only infect hepatitis B patients thus their complications are similar, only more aggressive. Acute hyperbilirubinemia is found in >70% of hepatitis E patients but chronic infection is scarce.

The transmission routes of hepatic viruses A and E are oral-faecal while that of hepatic viruses B, C and D are parenteral. In general, conditions that increase risk of contracting hepatitis viruses infections include

- Consuming raw shellfish
- Residing in or travelling to hepatitis-infested areas without being vaccinated
- Sharing needles
- Working in healthcare

== Pathophysiology ==
Mechanism of competitive inhibition. Certain drugs share the same plasma protein, bilirubin, for transportation in the bloodstream. When drug concentration is high, they may outcompete bilirubin for binding. Bilirubin is displaced out so serum unconjugated bilirubin levels rise, resulting in unconjugated hyperbilirubinemia.

Hyperbilirubinemia is classified into unconjugated and conjugated hyperbilirubinemia. The former, referring to elevated unconjugated bilirubin, is often caused by haemolytic diseases resulting in increased bilirubin production and impaired bilirubin conjugation. The latter is often attributed to direct hepatocyte injury that impedes conjugated bilirubin secretion. The underlying conditions of hyperbilirubinemia can be prehepatic, intrahepatic or post-hepatic.

=== Prehepatic Causes ===
Unconjugated hyperbilirubinemia arises before bilirubin reaches the liver as liver conjugation capacity is overwhelmed in haemolytic anaemias, in which red blood cells are disproportionately destroyed, leading to excessive haem metabolism thus bilirubin production. This may stem from hereditary spherocytosis, a congenital disease characterized by abnormally sphere-shaped erythrocytes, rendering erythrocytes prone to degradation. Other causes include enzyme irregularities like G6PD deficiency that produce unusually structured haemoglobins.

Apart from erythrocyte disorders, certain drugs bind to albumin competitively, occupying binding sites for bilirubin. For instance, sulfonamide, an antibacterial drug, displaces bilirubin from albumin, increasing free concentration of unconjugated bilirubin.

=== Intrahepatic Causes ===
Hepatocellular injury can cause unconjugated and conjugated hyperbilirubinemia.

==== Unconjugated Hyperbilirubinemia ====
Metabolic enzyme disorders hinder conjugation to varying degrees. Gilbert Syndrome, a hereditary disease affecting 5% of the US population, leads to stress-induced mild hyperbilirubinemia. The mutated UGT1 gene produces defective UGT1A1 enzymes vital for bilirubin conjugation.

This pathology is shared by another genetic disorder, Crigler-Najjar syndrome, which is subdivided into two types: type 1 (CN-1) and type 2 (CN-2), with the former displaying complete UGT1A1 enzyme activity loss and the latter only partially affected. Thus, unlike CN-1 displaying lifelong persistent jaundice, CN-2 shows milder symptoms and may escape diagnosis until adulthood.

==== Conjugated Hyperbilirubinemia ====
Hepatitis, commonly virus- or alcohol-induced, causes internal liver inflammation and disrupts conjugated bilirubin transport. Among primary hepatotropic viruses, Hepatitis A presents acute onset of jaundice, usually after the first 2–3 days upon entering the icteric phase while chronic Hepatitis B and C manifest jaundice gradually. As for alcohol, acute alcoholic hepatitis triggers a surge in bilirubin while chronic alcohol consumption affects liver bile acid uptake and secretion, causing chronic hyperbilirubinemia through diseases like steatosis and hepatitis.

Dubin-Johnson syndrome and Rotor's syndrome, both rare hereditary metabolic defects characterized by synthesis of faulty proteins responsible for exporting conjugated bilirubin out of hepatocytes, are responsible for majority of isolated hyperbilirubinemia. Dubin-Johnson syndrome is associated with ABCC gene mutations, creating insufficient functional MRP2 transporters for bilirubin excretion. Rotor syndrome is caused by homozygous SLCO1B1 and SLCO1B3 gene mutations which instruct production of OATP1B1 and OATP1B3 on hepatocyte membrane mediating uptake of bilirubin glucuronide from plasma. Innate shortage of MRP2, OATP1B1 and OATP1B3 in these two diseases lowers bilirubin removal efficiency, causing hyperbilirubinemia.

Drug-induced cholestasis is an adverse outcome of drug-induced-liver-disease. Mechanisms other than direct hepatocyte injury includes competitive inhibition by drug metabolites, such as troglitazone metabolites, that outcompete bilirubin for MRP2 transporters for secretion.

=== Post-hepatic Causes ===
Post-hepatic hyperbilirubinemia touches on problems arising after bilirubin conjugation, including intrinsic or extrinsic obstruction of the biliary tree that impedes excretion of conjugated bilirubin with bile.

==== Intrinsic Obstruction of the Duct System ====
Gallstones in the gallbladder, known as cholelithiasis, are the most common finding and may progress to cholecystitis, inflammation of gallbladder that obstructs bile outflow. Infection caused by cholelithiasis has symptoms of jaundice, fever and pain, collectively labelled Charcot's triad.

==== Extrinsic Obstruction of the Duct System ====
Secondary extra-hepatic disorders involve organs excluding the liver. When a tumour develops at the pancreas head or bile duct, the common bile duct is compressed, opposing bile flow, eventually leading to hyperbilirubinemia. Gallbladder carcinoma displays enlarged liver with Courvoisier's sign, a mass in the liver's right-upper quadrant.

== Complications ==
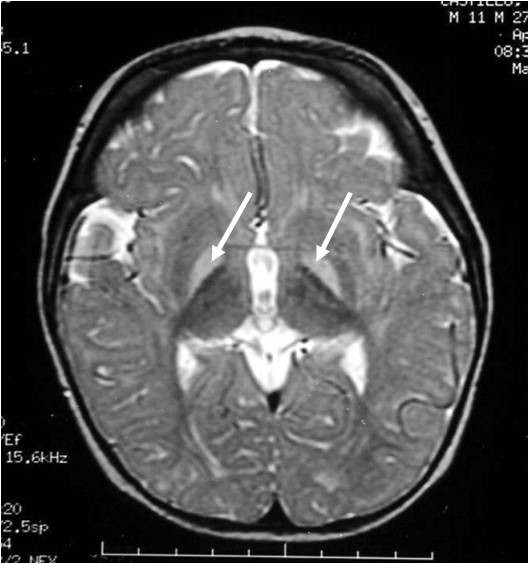
Magnetic resonance imaging (MRI) image of a brain suffering from kernicterus. Arrows label basal ganglia lesions.

Extremely high levels of unconjugated bilirubin in plasma enables bilirubin to cross the blood-brain-barrier to reach the brain and central nervous system to impart damage. This is termed kernicterus, or bilirubin encephalopathy. Kernicterus is rare in adults but is prevalent in newborns with underdeveloped blood-brain barriers and lower albumin binding capacities, which otherwise buffers excess bilirubin in adults. To date, only 4 such cases have been published, with 3 of them associated with CN-2, the milder form of the syndrome. The risk of developing kernicterus in CN-2 patients increases during physiological stress, such as prolonged fasting or anaesthesia. In infants, a bilirubin-albumin molar ratio of >0.8 reflecting insufficient bilirubin binding is considered at risk of developing kernicterus but the indicative value in adults remains unclear.

Unbound plasma bilirubin past a threshold exerts neurotoxic effects through triggering diversified metabolic cascades. It decreases oxygen consumption and increases neuronal apoptosis directly or indirectly through release of pro-inflammatory enzymes by glial cells. Primary targets affected are the basal ganglia, brainstem and cerebellum due to differential tissue binding, bilirubin uptake and cell's higher sensitivity to injury.

As this damage is irreversible, prophylactic treatment is essential to avoid critically high bilirubin levels.

== Treatment ==
Unlike neonates, hyperbilirubinemia itself requires no treatment in adults. Instead, treatment varies by underlying diseases.

As mentioned, cholelithiasis is the most common cause of hyperbilirubinemia. Gallstones can be removed using acid or shock waves in litholytic therapy and lithotripsy, respectively. Alternatively, cholecystectomy can remove the gallbladder directly. Once obstruction from the biliary tree is removed, normal bilirubin elimination should resume.

Currently, vaccination is most effective for prevention of hepatitis A while novel antiviral drugs have been developed for hepatitis B and C. However, hepatitis D and E-targeting therapies are absent. Patients with chimeric conditions of viral or alcoholic hepatitis, liver cirrhosis and liver failure require liver transplantation as a last resort.

== Outcomes ==
Patients with hyperbilirubinemia generally have poor outcome, particularly those with liver-dysfunction led jaundice. Drug-induced liver injury, as Hy's law states, patients with bilirubin of >3 mg/dL have 10% mortality rate. End stage liver disease models also include hyperbilirubinemia as a critical parameter in prognosis of cirrhosis. Moreover, serum bilirubin is positively associated with mortality in patients with severe sepsis or traumatic brain injury.
