= Organic anion transporter 1 =

Protein-coding gene in the species Homo sapiens

SLC22A6

Identifiers
- Aliases: SLC22A6, HOAT1, OAT1, PAHT, ROAT1, Organic anion transporter 1, solute carrier family 22 member 6
- External IDs: OMIM: 607582; MGI: 892001; GeneCards: SLC22A6

Gene location (Human)
| Chr. | Chromosome 11 (human) |
| Band | 11q12.3 | Start | 62,936,385 bp |
| Band | 11q12.3 | End | 62,984,967 bp |

Gene location (Mouse)
| Chr. | Chromosome 19 (mouse) |
| Band | 19 A|19 5.44 cM | Start | 8,595,403 bp |
| Band | 19 A|19 5.44 cM | End | 8,605,663 bp |
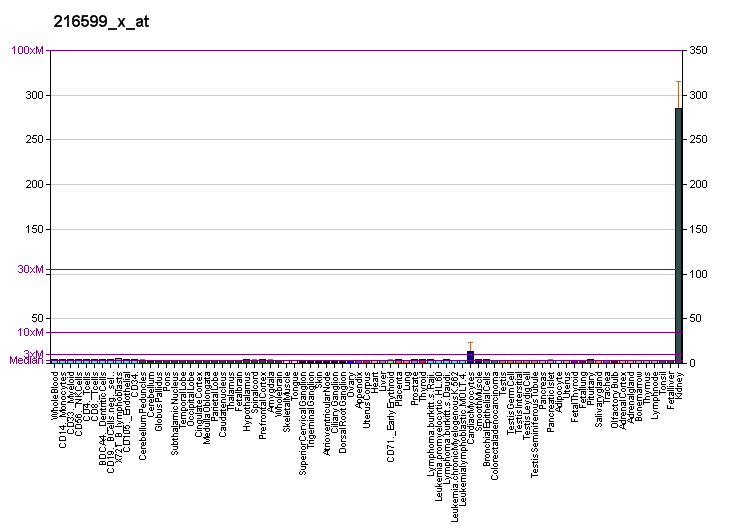

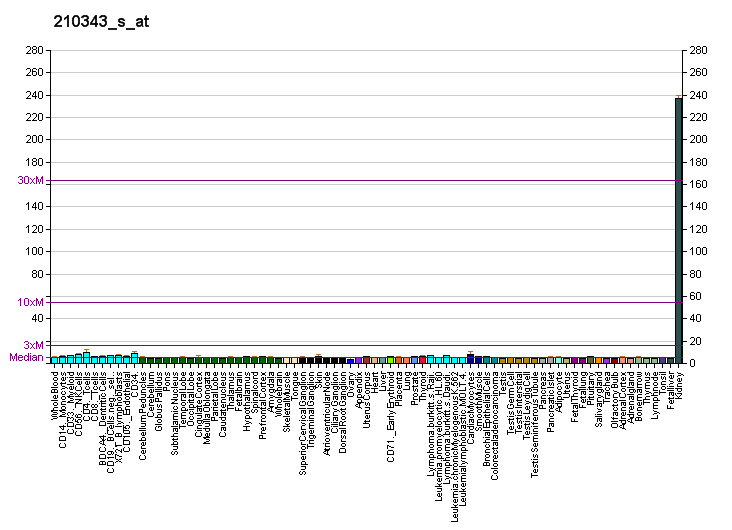
RNA expression pattern
| Bgee | Human / Mouse (ortholog); Top expressed in: kidney tubule; glomerulus; metanephric glomerulus; renal medulla; human kidney; buccal mucosa cell; retinal pigment epithelium; substantia nigra; hypothalamus; trigeminal ganglion / Top expressed in: right kidney; human kidney; proximal tubule; convoluted tubule; proximal convoluted tubule; optic nerve; Meckel's cartilage; inner renal medulla; yolk sac; embryo; More reference expression data |
| BioGPS | More reference expression data |
Gene ontology
| Molecular function | protein homodimerization activity; transmembrane transporter activity; protein binding; inorganic anion exchanger activity; chloride ion binding; organic anion transmembrane transporter activity; urate transmembrane transporter activity; sodium-independent organic anion transmembrane transporter activity |
| Cellular component | integral component of membrane; membrane; plasma membrane; integral component of plasma membrane; basolateral plasma membrane; caveola; extracellular exosome; protein-containing complex |
| Biological process | response to methotrexate; renal tubular secretion; anion transport; alpha-ketoglutarate transport; organic anion transport; protein homooligomerization; anion transmembrane transport; inorganic anion transport; transmembrane transport; urate transport; sodium-independent organic anion transport; organic acid transmembrane transport |
Sources:Amigo / QuickGO
Orthologs
| Databases | NCBI: entry; OMA: entry |
| Species | Human | Mouse |
| Entrez | 9356 | 18399 |
| Ensembl | ENSG00000197901 | ENSMUSG00000024650 |
| UniProt | Q4U2R8 | Q8VC69 |
| RefSeq (mRNA) | NM_153279; NM_004790; NM_153276; NM_153277; NM_153278 | NM_008766 |
| RefSeq (protein) | NP_004781; NP_695008; NP_695009; NP_695010 | NP_032792 |
| Location (UCSC) | Chr 11: 62.94 – 62.98 Mb | Chr 19: 8.6 – 8.61 Mb |
| PubMed search |
- Wikidata
| View/Edit Human | View/Edit Mouse |

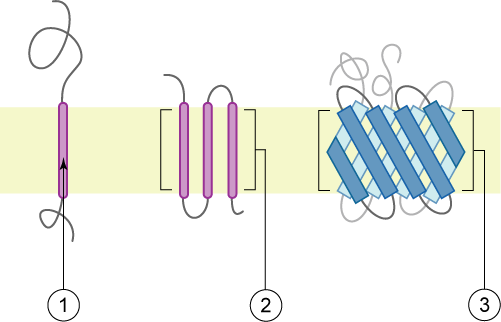
Figure 1 Schematic representation of transmembrane proteins: 1. a membrane protein with one transmembrane domain; 2. a membrane protein with three transmembrane domains; 3. OAT1 is believed to have twelve transmembrane domains.; The membrane is represented in light brown.

The organic anion transporter 1 (OAT1) also known as solute carrier family 22 member 6 (SLC22A6) is a protein that in humans is encoded by the SLC22A6 gene. It is a member of the organic anion transporter (OAT) family of proteins. OAT1 is a transmembrane protein that is expressed in the brain, the placenta, the eyes, smooth muscles, and the basolateral membrane of proximal tubular cells of the kidneys. It plays a central role in renal organic anion transport. Along with OAT3, OAT1 mediates the uptake of a wide range of relatively small and hydrophilic organic anions from plasma into the cytoplasm of the proximal tubular cells of the kidneys. From there, these substrates are transported into the lumen of the nephrons of the kidneys for excretion. OAT1 homologs have been identified in rats, mice, rabbits, pigs, flounders, and nematodes.

== Function ==
OAT1 functions as organic anion exchanger. When the uptake of one molecule of an organic anion is transported into a cell by an OAT1 exchanger, one molecule of an endogenous dicarboxylic acid (such as glutarate, ketoglutarate, etc.) is simultaneously transported out of the cell. As a result of the constant removal of endogenous dicarboxylic acid, OAT1-positive cells are at risk of depleting their supply of dicarboxylates. Once the supply of dicarboxylates is depleted, the OAT1 transporter can no longer function.

To prevent the loss of endogenous dicarboxylates, OAT1-positive cells also express a sodium-dicarboxylate cotransporter called NaDC3 that transports dicarboxylates back into the OAT1-positive cell. Sodium is required to drive this process. In the absence of a sodium gradient across the cell membrane, the NaDC3 cotransporter ceases to function, intra-cellular dicarboxylates are depleted, and the OAT1 transporter also grinds to a halt.

The renal organic anion transporters OAT1, OAT3, OATP4C1, MDR1, MRP2, MRP4 and URAT1 are expressed in the S2 segment of the proximal convoluted tubules of the kidneys. OAT1, OAT3, and OATP4C1 transport small organic anions from the plasma into the S2 cells. MDR1, MRP2, MRP4 and URAT1 then transports these organic anions from the cytoplasm of the S2 cells into the lumen of the proximal convoluted tubules. These organic anions are then excreted in the urine.

== Substrates ==
Known substrates of OAT1 include para-aminohippurate (PAH), dicarboxylates, prostaglandins, cyclic nucleotides, urate, folate, diuretics, ACE inhibitors, antiviral agents, beta-lactam antibiotics, antineoplastics, mycotoxins, sulfate conjugates, glucuronide conjugates, cysteine conjugates, ochratoxin A, NSAIDs, mercapturic acids and uremic toxins.

== Regulation ==
Alterations in the expression and function of OAT1 play important roles in intra- and inter-individual variability of the therapeutic efficacy and the toxicity of many drugs. As a result, the activity of OAT1 must be under tight regulation so as to carry out their normal functions. The regulation of OAT transport activity in response to various stimuli can occur at several levels such as transcription, translation, and posttranslational modification. Posttranslational regulation is of particular interest, because it usually happens within a very short period of time (minutes to hours) when the body has to deal with rapidly changing amounts of substances as a consequence of variable intake of drugs, fluids, or meals as well as metabolic activity. Post-translational modification is a process where new functional group(s) are conjugated to the amino acid side chains in a target protein through reversible or irreversible biochemical reactions. The common modifications include glycosylation, phosphorylation, ubiquitination, sulfation, methylation, acetylation, and hydroxylation.

== Antiviral induced Fanconi syndrome ==
Nucleoside analogs are a class of antiviral drugs that work by inhibiting viral nucleic acid synthesis. The nucleoside analogs acyclovir (ACV), zidovudine (AZT), didanosine (ddI), zalcitabine (ddC), lamivudine (3TC), stavudine (d4T), trifluridine, cidofovir, adefovir, and tenofovir (TDF) are substrates of the OAT1 transporter. This may result in the buildup of these drugs in the proximal tubule cells. At high concentrations, these drugs inhibit DNA replication. This, in turn, may impair the function of these cells and may be the cause of antiviral induced Fanconi syndrome. The use of stavudine, didenosine, abacavir, adefovir, cidofovir and tenofovir has been associated with Fanconi syndrome. Clinical features of tenofovir-induced Fanconi syndrome include glycosuria in the setting of normal serum glucose levels, phosphate wasting with hypophosphatemia, proteinuria (usually mild), acidosis, and hypokalemia, with or without acute renal failure.

=== Mitochondrial inhibition ===
Since nucleoside analogs can build up in OAT1-positive cells and can inhibit mitochondrial replication, these drugs may lead to the depletion of mitochondria inside renal proximal tubules. Renal biopsies have demonstrated the depletion of tubule cell mitochondria among individuals receiving antiviral therapy with tenofovir. The remaining mitochondria were enlarged and dysmorphic. In vitro the antiviral drugs didanosine and zidovudine are more potent inhibitors of mitochondrial DNA synthesis than tenofovir (ddI > AZT > TDF). In its non-phosphorylated form, the drug acyclovir does not significantly inhibit mitochondrial DNA synthesis, unless the cell happens to be infected with a herpes virus.

Stavudine, zidovudine and indinavir (IDV) cause a decrease in mitochondrial respiration and an increase in mitochondrial mass in fat cells. Stavudine also causes severe mitochondrial DNA depletion. Combining zidovudine with stavudine does not increase the mitochondrial toxicity compared to stavudine alone. Both of these drugs must be phosphorylated by host enzymes before they become active. Zidovudine inhibits the phosphorylation of stavudine. This might reduce the toxicity of the combination. Using indinavir in combination with the other two drugs did not increase the toxicity of the combination. Indinavir is a protease inhibitor and works by a different mechanism than the other antiviral drugs. (d4T+AZT+IDV = d4T+AZT = d4T+IDV > AZT+IDV = AZT = IDV). All three of these drugs inhibit the expression of respiratory chain subunits (cytochrome c oxidase [CytOx]2 and CytOx4) in white fat cells but not brown fat cells. Since stavudine and zidovudine are OAT1 substrates, they may have similar effects on proximal renal tubule cells as they do on fat cells.

Lamivudine has reverse chirality compared to didanosine, stavudine, zidovudine, and natural nucleosides. Mitochondrial DNA polymerase may not recognize it as a substrate. Lamivudine is not toxic to mitochondria in vivo. Individuals who had been taking didanosine combined with stavudine exhibited improved mitochondrial function when they switched to lamivudine combined with tenofovir.

Mitochondrial toxicity of OAT1 substrates:

- in vitro:
  - d4T+AZT = d4T > AZT
  - ddI > AZT > TDF > ACV
- in vivo
  - d4T > AZT
  - ddI > AZT > TDF
  - d4T + ddI > 3TC + TDF

== See also ==
- Solute carrier family
