= MRP2 =

MRP2 may refer to:

- Multidrug resistance-associated protein 2
- Manufacturing resource planning (MRP2 or MRP II)
