= PTCA =

PTCA may refer to:

- Percutaneous transluminal coronary angioplasty, a type of angioplasty
- Percutaneous transhepatic cholangiography
