= Lipoprotein-X =

Abnormal low density lipoprotein found in cholestasis

Lipoprotein-X (Lp-X) is an abnormal low density lipoprotein found in cholestasis.

== Structure ==
Lipoprotein-X is a lamellar particle of 30 to 70 nm in diameter as revealed by electron microscopy. It is characterized by its high content of phospholipids (66% by weight) and unesterified cholesterol (22%), and its low content of protein (6%), cholesterol esters (3%), and triglycerides (3%). The protein component is dominated by albumin, located in the core, and by apolipoprotein C, located on the surface of the particle. Using zonal ultracentrifugation, lipoprotein-X can be divided into three distinct populations: Lp-X1, Lp-X2, and Lp-X3, differing in density and apolipoprotein composition.

== Pathogenesis ==
The pathogenesis of lipoprotein-X in cholestasis is not totally resolved. Normally, the liver excretes lipoprotein complexes into the bile showing phospholipid and unesterified cholesterol concentrations similar to Lipoprotein-X. The in vitro incubation of these bile lipoproteins with serum or albumin leads to the appearance of Lp-X–like particles. These findings suggest that the reflux of bile into the plasma compartment causes the formation of lipoprotein-X in cholestasis as a result of a physicochemical, nonmetabolic process. On the other hand, lipoprotein-X particles found in familial LCAT deficiency are identical to those in cholestasis regarding ultrastructure and biochemical composition. It has been supposed that reduced LCAT activities, common in patients with hepatocellular disease, cause, alone or in combination with other factors, the formation of Lipoprotein-X in cholestasis. Lipoprotein-X is mainly removed by the reticuloendothelial system of the liver and the spleen, as shown by studies using radioactively labeled lipoprotein-X in rats. Other organs, such as the kidney, also actively clear Lipoprotein-X from the plasma.

== Literature ==
- Seidel D, Alaupovic P, Furman RH, McConathy WJ (December 1970). "A lipoprotein characterizing obstructive jaundice. II. Isolation and partial characterization of the protein moieties of low density lipoproteins". J. Clin. Invest. 49 (12): 2396–407. doi:10.1172/JCI106459. PMC 322741. PMID 5480863.
