= Interlobular bile ducts =

Type of organ

Details

Identifiers
- Latin: ductuli interlobulares
- TA98: A05.8.01.060
- TA2: 3064
- FMA: 71644

The interlobular bile ducts (or interlobular ductules) carry bile in the liver between the Canals of Hering and the interlobar bile ducts. They are part of the interlobular portal triad and can be easily localized by looking for the much larger portal vein. The cells of the ducts are described as cuboidal epithelium with increasing amounts of connective tissue around it.
