= 5'-nucleotidase =

InterPro Family

5′-nucleotidase
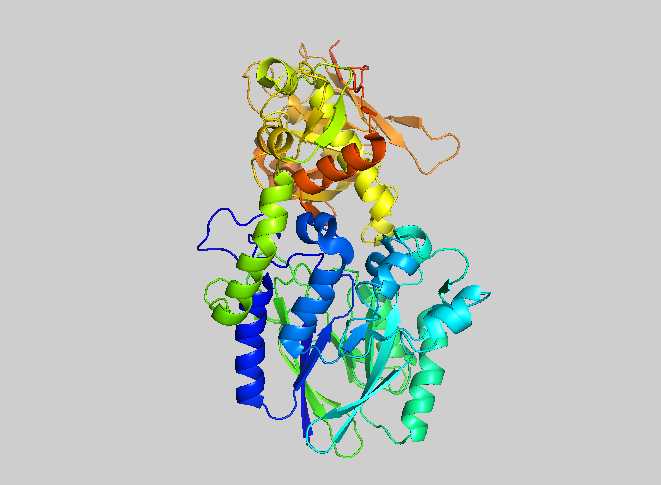
- Human ecto-5′-nucleotidase (CD73): crystal form I (open) in complex with adenosine

Identifiers
- EC no.: 3.1.3.5
- CAS no.: 9027-73-0

Databases
- BRENDA: enzyme data
- ExPASy: NiceZyme view
- KEGG: enzyme entry
- MetaCyc: metabolic pathway
- Rhea: reactions
- PDB structures: RCSB PDB PDBe PDBsum
Search
- PMC: articles
- PubMed: articles
- NCBI: proteins

5′-nucleotidase (EC 3.1.3.5) is an enzyme which catalyzes the phosphorylytic cleavage of 5′-nucleotides. Although originally found in snake venom, the activity of 5′-nucleotidase has been described for bacteria and plant cells, and is widely distributed in vertebrate tissue. In mammalian cells the enzyme is predominantly located in the plasma membrane and its primary role is in the conversion of extracellular nucleotides (e.g. 5′-AMP), which are generally impermeable, to the corresponding nucleoside (e.g. adenosine) which can readily enter most cells. Consequently, the enzyme plays a key role in the metabolism of nucleotides.

The enzyme has a wide substrate specificity for nucleotides and has been shown to hydrolyze 5′-nucleotides rapidly, ribose-5-phosphate slowly, and other phosphate esters extremely slowly (if at all).

The enzyme catalyses the following reaction:

a 5′-nucleotide + H_{2}O ⇌ a nucleoside + phosphate

The 5′-nucleotidase-catalyzed reaction of an AMP nucleotide to adenosine nucleoside is shown below:

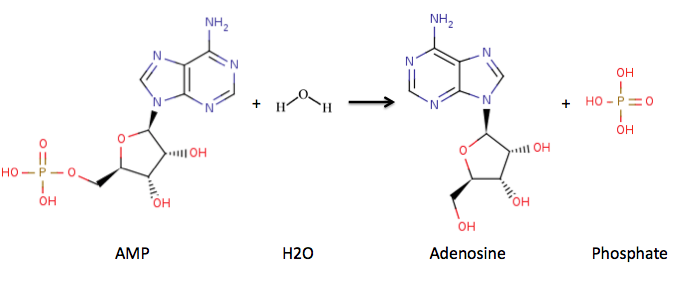
AMP + H_{2}O $\rightleftharpoons$ adenosine + phosphate

== Nomenclature ==
- Accepted Name: 5′-nucleotidase
- Systematic Name: 5′-ribonucleotide phosphohydrolase
- Synonyms: uridine 5′-nucleotidase, 5′-adenylic phosphatase, adenosine 5′-phosphatase, AMP phosphatase, adenosine monophosphatase, 5′-mononucleotidase, AMPase, UMPase, snake venom 5′-nucleotidase, thymidine monophosphate nucleotidase, 5′-AMPase, 5′-AMP nucleotidase, AMP phosphohydrolase, IMP 5′-nucleotidase.

== Structure ==
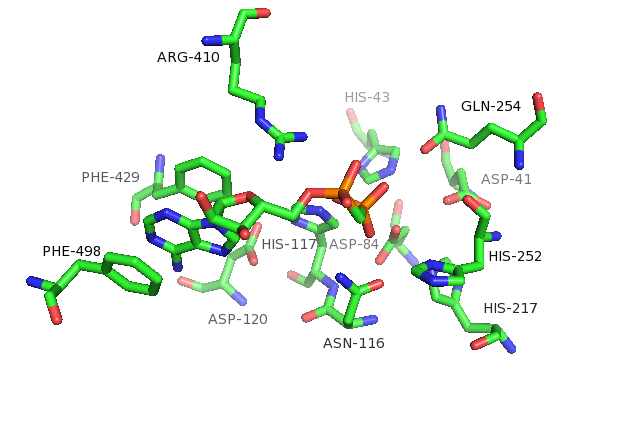
Active-site structure of 5′-nucleotidase with the inhibitor adenosine

=== Active site ===
Studies of the soluble form of human ecto-5′-nucleotidase, without a GPI anchor, have shown that the C-terminal domain holds the substrate-binding pocket, and that the aromatic purine motif of the substrate is stacked between two phenylalanine residues. Furthermore, a catalytic mechanism has been proposed involving an in-line nucleophilic attack by a hydroxyl moiety that is coordinated by zinc on the substrate phosphorus, with the nucleoside acting as a leaving group.

=== Membrane-bound and soluble forms ===
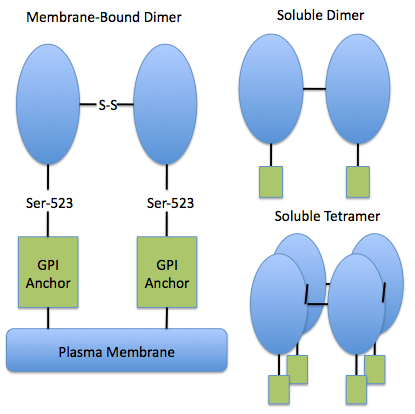
Cartoon schematic of membrane-bound and soluble forms of mammalian 5′-nucleotidase

Studies of mammalian 5′-nucleotidases have shown that there exist at least four different forms of the 5′-nucleotidase enzyme: one membrane-bound form and three soluble forms. The membrane-bound form is anchored to the plasma membrane via GPI at its C-terminus. One of the soluble forms appears to be derived from the GPI-anchored ex-5′-nucleotidase and has an extracellular location. The two cytosolic forms of the enzyme have similar characteristics, but can be differentiated on the basis of their preferential affinities for nucleotide substrates. The GPI-anchored form exists as a dimer, with the two subunits linked via a disulfide bridge. The soluble forms can exist as dimers or tetramers. Generally at least 50% of the enzyme is found in the surface-bound form.

== Medical relevance ==
=== 5′ nucleotidase blood test ===
The concentration of 5′-nucleotidase protein in the blood is often used as a liver function test in individuals that show signs of liver problems. The combined assays of serum 5′-nucleotisase and alkaline phosphatase (AP) activities are extremely helpful in differential diagnosis since serum 5′-nucleotidase activity is increased in obstructive hepatobiliary disorders, but not in osseous disorders, whereas serum AP activity is generally increased in both categories of diseases. In other words, the test is used to determine if elevated protein levels are due to skeletal damage or liver damage. Normal levels of 5′-nucleotidase are 2-17 units per liter. Elevated levels may indicate cholestasis, destruction of liver cells, hepatitis (liver inflammation), liver ischemia, a liver tumor, or use of liver-damaging drugs. Pregnancy and certain medications (acetaminophen, halothane, isoniazid, methyldopa, nitrofurantoin) may interfere with the test.

The test may also be referred to as 5′NT Levels Blood Test, CDF73 Levels Blood Test, and Ecto-5′-Nucleotidase Levels Blood Test.

=== Lymphocyte 5′-nucleotidase in immunological disorders ===
Ecto-5′-nucleotidase is considered a maturation marker for T cells and B cells. This is due to the fact that the enzyme activity is approximately 10-times higher for peripheral T cells than thymocytes, 5-6 times higher in adult peripheral B cells than fetal B cells, and largely absent in non-T cell and non-B cell lymphocytes. In immunodeficiency diseases with arrested lymphocyte maturation, ex-5′-nucleatidase activity is generally low. Such diseases include severe combined immuno-deficiency, Wiskott–Aldrich syndrome, congenital X-linked agammaglobulinemia, selective IgA deficiency and acquired immune deficiency syndrome (AIDS).

=== Relation to lead poisoning ===
Numerous studies have shown that erythrocyte pyrimidine 5′-nucleotidase activity is significantly lowered in patients with lead poisoning, and that pyrimidine 5′-nucleotidase activity can be used as an index of lead poisoning. It is believed that lead induced deficiency of the enzyme in maturing erythroid cells is responsible for basophilic stippling and hemolysis in a manner analogous to the pathogenesis of the hereditary enzyme deficiency syndrome. The mechanism of inhibition of 5′-nucleotidase in lead poisoning may contribute to the hemolytic syndromes that occur in patients with acute lead poisoning. Since erythrocyte pyrimidine 5′NT activity is inhibited in vitro by various metals (e.g., copper, zinc, cadmium, lead, mercury, and tin), it is likely that inhibition of pyrimidine 5′-nucleotidase may contribute to the hemolytic syndromes that occur in patients with acute poisoning by these metals.

=== Cytosolic 5-nucleotidase II superactivity ===
Cytosolic 5-nucleotidase II superactivity has been associated with autism spectrum disorder via a disorder of carnitine biosynthesis.
