= Bilirubin glucuronide =

Chemical compound

Names
- IUPAC name 3-[12-(2-Carboxyethyl)-3,18-diethenyl-2,7,13,17-tetramethyl-1,19-dioxo-10,19,21,22,23,24-hexahydro-1H-bilin-8-yl]propanoyl β-D-glucopyranosiduronic acid
- Systematic IUPAC name [1^{2}(2)Z,10^{2}S,10^{3}R,10^{4}S,10^{5}S,10^{6}S]-3^{4}-(2-Carboxyethyl)-1^{4}-ethenyl-5^{5}-[(Z)-(3-ethenyl-4-methyl-5-oxo-1,5-dihydro-2H-pyrrol-2-ylidene)methyl]-10^{3},10^{4},10^{5}-trihydroxy-1^{3},3^{3},5^{4}-trimethyl-1^{5},8-dioxo-1^{1},1^{5}-dihydro-3^{1}H,5^{1}H-9-oxa-1(2),3(2,5),5(2,3)-tripyrrola-10(2)-oxanadecaphan-1^{2}(2)-ene-10^{6}-carboxylic acid
- Other names Bilirubin monoglucuronide

Identifiers
CAS Number	27071-67-6
3D model (JSmol)	Interactive image
ChEBI	CHEBI:16427
ChEMBL	ChEMBL2074720
ChemSpider	4444203
KEGG	C03374
PubChem CID	5280588
- InChI: InChI=1S/C39H44N4O12/c1-7-20-19(6)36(50)43-27(20)14-25-18(5)23(10-12-31(46)54-39-34(49)32(47)33(48)35(55-39)38(52)53)29(41-25)15-28-22(9-11-30(44)45)17(4)24(40-28)13-26-16(3)21(8-2)37(51)42-26/h7-8,13-14,32-35,39-41,47-49H,1-2,9-12,15H2,3-6H3,(H,42,51)(H,43,50)(H,44,45)(H,52,53)/b26-13-,27-14-/t32-,33-,34+,35-,39+/m0/s1 Key: ARBDURHEPGRPSR-LCNKTQGVSA-N
- SMILES: CC1=C(NC(=C1CCC(=O)O)CC2=C(C(=C(N2)/C=C\3/C(=C(C(=O)N3)C)C=C)C)CCC(=O)O[C@H]4[C@@H]([C@H]([C@@H]([C@H](O4)C(=O)O)O)O)O)/C=C\5/C(=C(C(=O)N5)C=C)C

Properties
Chemical formula	C_{39}H_{44}N_{4}O_{12}
Molar mass	760.797 g·mol^{−1}
- Except where otherwise noted, data are given for materials in their standard state (at 25 °C [77 °F], 100 kPa). Infobox references

Bilirubin glucuronide is a water-soluble reaction intermediate over the process of conjugation of indirect bilirubin. Bilirubin glucuronide itself belongs to the category of conjugated bilirubin along with bilirubin di-glucuronide. However, only the latter one is primarily excreted into the bile in the normal setting.

Upon macrophages spot and phagocytize the effete Red Blood Corpuscles containing hemoglobin, unconjugated bilirubin is discharged from macrophages into the blood plasma. Most often, the free and water-insoluble unconjugated bilirubin which has an internal hydrodren bonding will bind to albumin and, to a much lesser extent, high density lipoprotein in order to decrease its hydrophobicity and to limit the probability of unnecessary contact with other tissues and keep bilirubin in the vascular space from traversing to extravascular space including brain, and from ending up increasing glomerular filtration. Nevertheless, there is still a little portion of indirect bilirubins stays free-of-bound. Free unconjugated bilirubin can poison the cerebrum.

Finally, albumin leads the indirect bilirubin to the liver. In the liver sinusoid, albumin disassociates with the indirect bilirubin and returns to the circulation while the hepatocyte transfers the indirect bilirubin to ligandin and glucuronide conjugates the indirect bilirubin in the endoplasmic reticulum by disrupting unconjugated bilirubin's internal hydrogen bonding, which is the thing that makes indirect bilirubin having the property of eternal half-elimination life and insoluble in water, and by attaching two molecules of glucuronic acid to it in a two step process. The reaction is a transfer of two glucuronic acid groups including UDP glucuronic acid sequentially to the propionic acid groups of the bilirubin, primarily catalyzed by UGT1A1. In greater detail about this reaction, a glucuronosyl moiety is conjugated to one of the propionic acid side chains, located on the C8 and C12 carbons of the two central pyrrole rings of bilirubin.

When the first step is completely done, the substrate bilirubin glucuronide (also known as mono-glucuronide) is born at this stage and is water-soluble and readily excreted in bile. Thereafter, so long as the second step of attachment of the other glucuronic acid to it succeeds (officially called "re-glucuronidated"), the substrate bilirubin glucuronide will turn into bilirubin di-glucuronide (8,12-diglucuronide) and be excreted into bile canaliculi by way of C-MOAT (Note: C-MOAT is located in the canalicular membrane within the apical region of the hepatocyte.) and MRP2 as normal human bile along with a little amount of unconjugated bilirubin as much as only 1 to 4 percent of total pigments in normal bile. That means up to 96%-99% of bilirubin in the bile are conjugated.

Normally, there is just a little conjugated bilirubin escapes into the general circulation. Nonetheless, in the setting of severe liver disease, a significantly greater number of conjugated bilirubin will leak into circulation and then dissolve into the blood (Note: Because conjugated bilirubin is water soluble and so does in blood.) and thereby filtered by the kidney, and only a part of the leaked conjugated bilirubin will be re-absorbed in the renal tubules, the remainder will be present in the urine making it dark-colored.

== Clinical significance ==
The clinical significance of bilirubin glucuronide is involved in many conditions. Drugs that inhibit the activities of the components involved in bilirubin metabolism can give rise to accumulation of bilirubin in the blood. In comparison, conjugation of some drugs is also usually impaired if the liver cannot normally metabolize indirect bilirubin.

=== Renal ===
When excretion of bilirubin glucuronide by the kidney is detected in the urine through urine examination, meaning that a conspicuous amount of conjugated bilirubin is present and circulating in the blood.

=== Dubin–Johnson syndrome ===
In Dubin–Johnson syndrome, impaired biliary excretion of bilirubin glucuronide is due to a mutation in the canalicular multiple drug-resistance protein 2 (MRP2). A darkly pigmented liver is due to polymerized epinephrine metabolites, not bilirubin.

=== Liver failure or hepatitis ===
If it is the liver that cannot effectively transfer the indirect bilirubin into bilirubin glucuronide and further into bilirubin di-glucuronide, the consequence will be hyperbilirubinemia or intrahepatic (or hepatocellular) jaundice.

Moreover, the unconjugated hyperbilirubinemia arises in case the components of liver transfer the indirect bilirubin into bilirubin glucuronide in the rate slower than they should be. This condition is associated with either decreased uptake of bilirubin into hepatocytes (Rotor syndrome) or defective intracellular protein binding.

In similar fashion, the conjugated hyperbilirubinemia emerges in case the components of the liver have difficulty turning bilirubin glucuronide into bilirubin di-glucuronide. Note that biliary duct blockage can also lead to conjugated hyperbilirubinemia but the pathophysiology is that backflow of bilirubin di-glucuronide with little indirect bilirubin and bilirubin glucuronide from bile duct through liver into blood plasma. These conditions are associated with either defective intracellular protein binding (for the second time) or disturbed secretion into the bile canaliculi (Dubin–Johnson syndrome).

Liver failure and hepatitis are the most etiological in liver-genesis hyperbilirubinemia. In case of hyperbilirubinemia due to intrahepatic or extrahepatic bile ducts blockage, e.g. gallstone, the name is given as Post-hepatic (or obstructive) jaundice.

Bilirubin concentration is not a sensitive early indicator of liver diseases as the liver may have reserved its capacity in removal of bilirubin to save energy and unreserved the previously reserved capacity when encountering a sudden rise of unconjugated bilirubin. In short, there is still a chance for an ill liver to get rid of excessive unconjugated bilirubin in the blood plasma, displaying a total bilirubin level that is within normal reference range.

=== Crigler Najjar disease ===
In Crigler Najjar disease, there is an inherited deficiency of glucuronyl transferase resulting in high concentrations of unconjugated bilirubin appear in the plasma. Furthermore, those affected may develop kernicterus (deposits of pigment in the brain) that can cause nerve degeneration.

=== Gilbert's syndrome ===
In Gilbert's syndrome, glucuronyl transferase activity is reduced by approximately 70%, leading to mild accumulation of unconjugated bilirubin in the plasma.

=== Neonate jaundice ===
At birth, infants don't develop enough ability to conjugate bilirubin. Up to 8% to 11% neonates will develop hyperbilirubinemia in the first week of their lives.

=== Hemolytic jaundice ===
In jaundice owing to hemolysis (prehepatic, or hemolytic, jaundice), the pathophysiology is that overproduction of bilirubin from the extravascular or intravascular hemolysis overwhelms the capacity of the liver to excrete it. The bilirubin present in the plasma is largely unconjugated in this setting as they haven't been taken up and conjugated by the liver. In this case, total serum bilirubin increases while the ratio of direct bilirubin to indirect bilirubin remains 96 to 4 as up to 96%-99% of bilirubin in the bile are conjugated mentioned above.

=== Brain damage ===
Although there were some studies that showed an inverse correlation between serum bilirubin level and prevalences of ischemic coronary artery disease, cancer mortality, or colorectal cancer in general population, the potential benefits of the chemopreventive function of bilirubin and their causative relations haven't been proved.
