= Bilirubin diglucuronide =

Names
- IUPAC name (2,17-Diethenyl-3,7,13,18-tetramethyl-1,19-dioxo-10,19,21,22,23,24-hexahydro-1H-biline-8,12-diyl)bis(1-oxopropane-3,1-diyl) di(β-D-glucopyranosiduronic acid)
- Systematic IUPAC name (1^{2}S,1^{3}R,1^{4}S,1^{5}S,1^{6}S,13^{2}S,13^{3}R,13^{4}S,13^{5}S,13^{6}S)-6^{5}-[(Z)-(3-Ethenyl-4-methyl-5-oxo-1,5-dihydro-2H-pyrrol-2-ylidene)methyl]-8^{5}-[(Z)-(4-ethenyl-3-methyl-5-oxo-1,5-dihydro-2H-pyrrol-2-ylidene)methyl]-1^{3},1^{4},1^{5},13^{3},13^{4},13^{5}-hexahydroxy-6^{4},8^{4}-dimethyl-3,11-dioxo-6^{1}H,8^{1}H-2,12-dioxa-6(3,2),8(2,3)-dipyrrola-1,13(2)-bis(oxana)tridecaphane-1^{6},13^{6}-dicarboxylic acid

Identifiers
| CAS Number | 17459-92-6 |
| 3D model (JSmol) | Interactive image |
| ChemSpider | 4573640 |
| MeSH | bilirubin+diglucuronide |
| PubChem CID | 5280817 |
| UNII | 9L71584RCM |
| CompTox Dashboard (EPA) | DTXSID40904013 |
- InChI: InChI=1S/C45H52N4O18/c1-7-20-19(6)40(58)49-27(20)14-25-18(5)23(10-12-31(51)65-45-37(57)33(53)35(55)39(67-45)43(62)63)29(47-25)15-28-22(17(4)24(46-28)13-26-16(3)21(8-2)41(59)48-26)9-11-30(50)64-44-36(56)32(52)34(54)38(66-44)42(60)61/h7-8,13-14,32-39,44-47,52-57H,1-2,9-12,15H2,3-6H3,(H,48,59)(H,49,58)(H,60,61)(H,62,63)/b26-13+,27-14+/t32-,33-,34-,35-,36+,37+,38-,39-,44+,45+/m0/s1 Key: SCJLWMXOOYZBTH-SDXZDYKGSA-N; InChI=1/C45H52N4O18/c1-7-20-19(6)40(58)49-27(20)14-25-18(5)23(10-12-31(51)65-45-37(57)33(53)35(55)39(67-45)43(62)63)29(47-25)15-28-22(17(4)24(46-28)13-26-16(3)21(8-2)41(59)48-26)9-11-30(50)64-44-36(56)32(52)34(54)38(66-44)42(60)61/h7-8,13-14,32-39,44-47,52-57H,1-2,9-12,15H2,3-6H3,(H,48,59)(H,49,58)(H,60,61)(H,62,63)/b26-13+,27-14+/t32-,33-,34-,35-,36+,37+,38-,39-,44+,45+/m0/s1 Key: SCJLWMXOOYZBTH-SDXZDYKGBT
- SMILES: Cc1c(c([nH]c1/C=C/2\C(=C(C(=O)N2)C=C)C)Cc3c(c(c([nH]3)/C=C/4\C(=C(C(=O)N4)C)C=C)C)CCC(=O)O[C@H]5[C@@H]([C@H]([C@@H]([C@H](O5)C(=O)O)O)O)O)CCC(=O)O[C@H]6[C@@H]([C@H]([C@@H]([C@H](O6)C(=O)O)O)O)O

Properties
| Chemical formula | C_{45}H_{52}N_{4}O_{18} |
| Molar mass | 936.911 g/mol |
- Except where otherwise noted, data are given for materials in their standard state (at 25 °C [77 °F], 100 kPa). verify (what is ?) Infobox references

Bilirubin di-glucuronide is a conjugated form of bilirubin formed in bilirubin metabolism. The hydrophilic character of bilirubin diglucuronide enables it to be water-soluble. It is pumped across the hepatic canalicular membrane into the bile by the transporter MRP2.

Bilirubin molecular species play an important role in early diagnosis, prognosis and prevention of liver diseases. Measuring the levels of unconjugated bilirubin, monoglucuronide and diglucuronide is done by using a high performance liquid chromotography method to determine bilirubin fractions in blood of patients. Unconjugated bilirubin has to convert to water soluble monoglucuronide and diglucuronide so the levels of these show a correlation between them and inflammation in liver disease.

== See also ==
- Bilirubin mono-glucuronide
