= Canals of Hering =

Part of the liver

- The canal of Hering, not labeled, leads to the bile ductule

Details

Identifiers
- Latin: ductulus bilifer
- FMA: 17545

The canals of Hering, or intrahepatic bile ductules, are part of the outflow system of exocrine bile product from the liver. Liver stem cells are hypothesized to inhabit the canals.

== Structure ==
They are found between the bile canaliculi and interlobular bile ducts near the outer edge of a classic liver lobule.

=== Histology ===
Histologically, the cells of the ductule are described as simple cuboidal epithelium, lined partially by cholangiocytes and hepatocytes. They may not be readily visible but can be differentially stained by cytokeratins CK19 and CK7.

== Clinical relevance ==
The canals of Hering are destroyed early in primary biliary cholangitis and may be primary sites of scarring in methotrexate toxicity. Research has indicated the presence of intraorgan stem cells of the liver that can proliferate in disease states, so-called oval cells. Liver stem cells are theorized to originate in the niches of the canals.

== History ==
They are named for Ewald Hering.
