= Anion exchange protein 2 =

Protein found in humans

SLC4A2
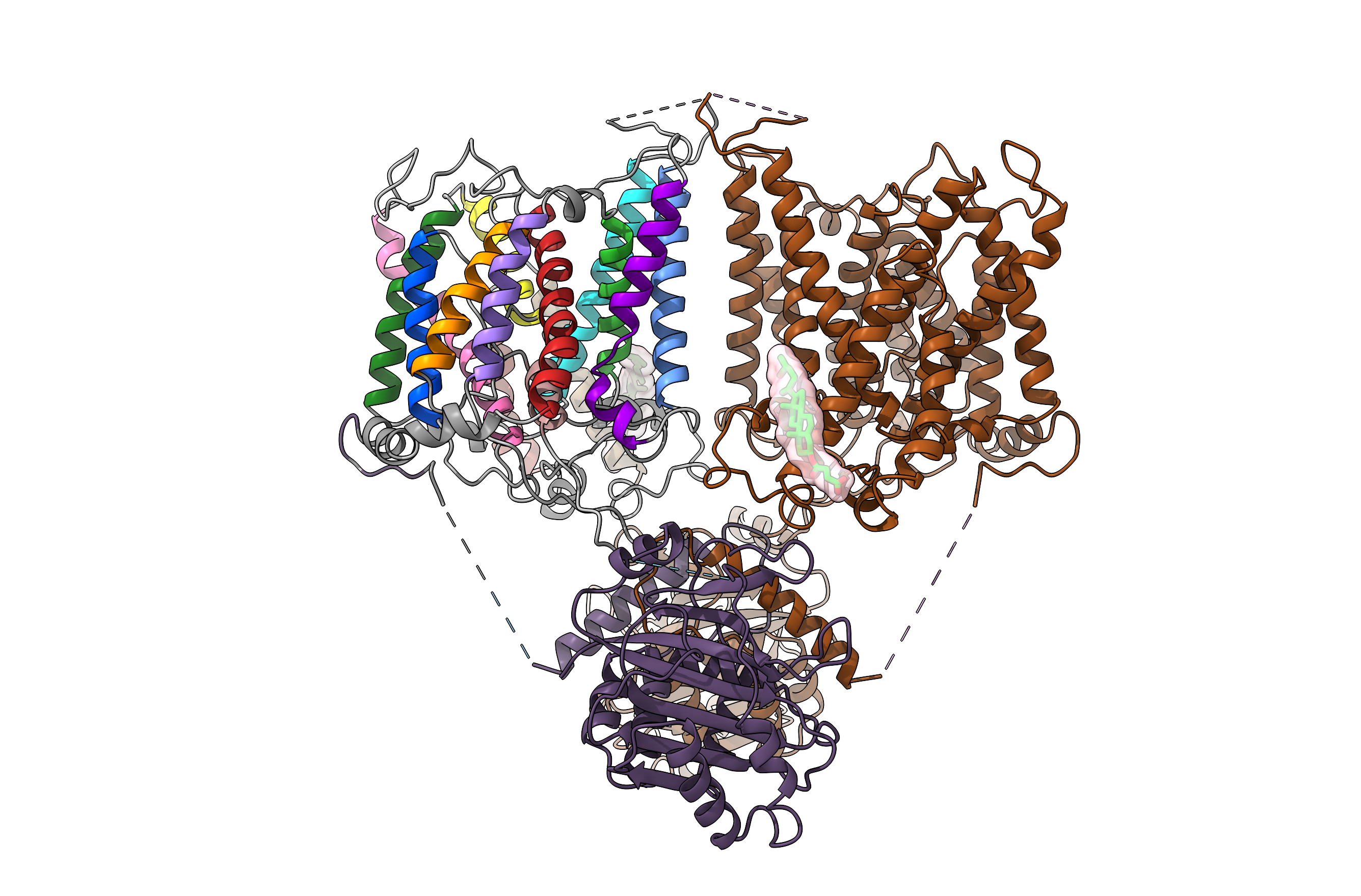

Identifiers
- Aliases: SLC4A2, AE2, BND3L, EPB3L1, HKB3, NBND3, solute carrier family 4 member 2
- External IDs: OMIM: 109280; MGI: 109351; GeneCards: SLC4A2

Gene location (Human)
Chr.	Chromosome 7 (human)
Band	7q36.1	Start	151,057,210 bp
Band	7q36.1	End	151,076,526 bp

Gene location (Mouse)
Chr.	Chromosome 5 (mouse)
Band	5 A3|5 11.74 cM	Start	24,628,835 bp
Band	5 A3|5 11.74 cM	End	24,645,948 bp
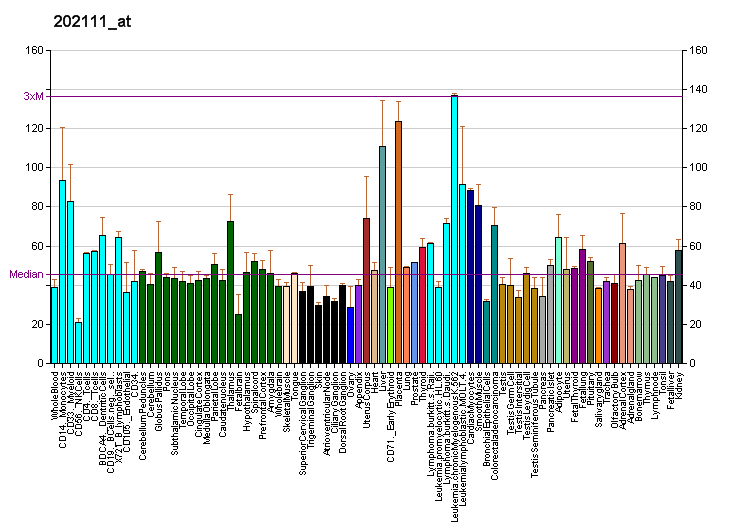
RNA expression pattern
Bgee	Human / Mouse (ortholog); Top expressed in: body of stomach; muscle layer of sigmoid colon; canal of the cervix; right lobe of liver; mucosa of transverse colon; body of uterus; body of pancreas; stromal cell of endometrium; left uterine tube; right ovary / Top expressed in: choroid plexus of fourth ventricle; epithelium of stomach; Epithelium of choroid plexus; vestibular membrane of cochlear duct; yolk sac; mucous cell of stomach; retinal pigment epithelium; pyloric antrum; molar; granulocyte; More reference expression data
BioGPS	More reference expression data
Gene ontology
Molecular function	enzyme binding; anion transmembrane transporter activity; antiporter activity; transporter activity; inorganic anion exchanger activity; sodium:bicarbonate symporter activity
Cellular component	integral component of membrane; plasma membrane; basolateral plasma membrane; apical plasma membrane; membrane; focal adhesion; integral component of plasma membrane
Biological process	digestive tract development; anion transport; spermatogenesis; ion transport; regulation of intracellular pH; inorganic anion transport; transmembrane transport; anion transmembrane transport; bicarbonate transport; sodium ion transmembrane transport; transport
Sources:Amigo / QuickGO
Orthologs
Databases	NCBI: entry; OMA: entry
Species	Human	Mouse
Entrez	6522	20535
Ensembl	ENSG00000164889	ENSMUSG00000028962
UniProt	P04920	P13808
RefSeq (mRNA)	NM_001199692; NM_001199693; NM_001199694; NM_003040	NM_001253892; NM_009207
RefSeq (protein)	NP_001186621; NP_001186622; NP_001186623; NP_003031	NP_001240821; NP_033233
Location (UCSC)	Chr 7: 151.06 – 151.08 Mb	Chr 5: 24.63 – 24.65 Mb
PubMed search
- Wikidata
View/Edit Human	View/Edit Mouse

Anion exchange protein 2 (AE2) is a membrane transport protein that in humans is encoded by the SLC4A2 gene. AE2 is functionally similar to the Band 3 Cl^{−}/HCO_{3}^{−} exchange protein.

Mice have been used to explore the function of AE2. AE2 contributes to basolateral membrane HCO_{3}^{−} transport in the gastrointestinal tract. AE2 is required for spermiogenesis in mice. AE2 is required for normal osteoclast function. The activity of AE2 is sensitive to pH.

AE3 has been suggested as a target for prevention of diabetic vasculopathy.

== Structure ==
The cryo electron microscopic studies revealed that human AE2 protein forms a homodimer and stays in resting state of inward-facing conformation at physiological pH. A loop between transmembrane (TM) helices 10 and 11 extends from TM domain into its cytoplamic domain, forming a "trigger" locking the TM helices in the resting state. In addition, the C-terminal loop (CTD loop) inserts into the anion binding pocket to further block its activities.

== Mechanism of ion exchange ==
During the process of acid secretion, the cellular pH increases, triggering the release of the "trigger" loop from the cytoplasmic domain. This allows for the re-arrangement of the TM helices, while the CTD loop is forced out, enabling HCO_{3}^{−} binding. Further conformational changes then turn the AE2 protein into an outward-facing conformation, releasing HCO_{3}^{−} into the extracellular environment and capturing Cl^{−} into the binding pocket. Finally, the AE2 protein returns to its inward-facing conformation and releases Cl^{−} into the cytosol. This working cycle of the AE2 protein replaces a weak acid anion with a strong acid anion, thereby lowering the cellular pH and rebalancing pH homeostasis.

== See also ==
- Solute carrier family
