= SLC22A8 =

Protein-coding gene in the species Homo sapiens

Identifiers
- Aliases: SLC22A8, OAT3, solute carrier family 22 member 8
- External IDs: OMIM: 607581; MGI: 1336187; GeneCards: SLC22A8

Gene location (Human)
Chr.	Chromosome 11 (human)
Band	11q12.3	Start	62,989,154 bp
Band	11q12.3	End	63,015,841 bp

Gene location (Mouse)
Chr.	Chromosome 19 (mouse)
Band	19|19 A	Start	8,568,618 bp
Band	19|19 A	End	8,589,199 bp
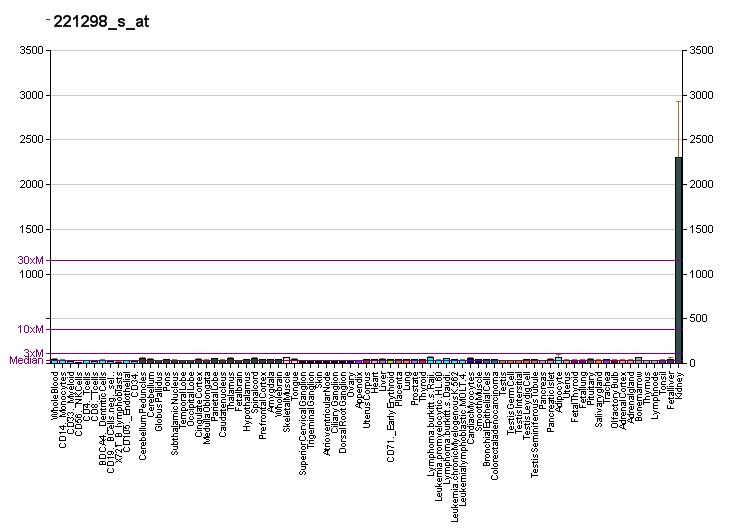
RNA expression pattern
Bgee	Human / Mouse (ortholog); Top expressed in: retinal pigment epithelium; kidney tubule; metanephric glomerulus; human kidney; testicle; renal medulla; vena cava; vasculature of head; gonad; Epithelium of choroid plexus / Top expressed in: right kidney; human kidney; retinal pigment epithelium; optic nerve; proximal tubule; ciliary body; olfactory tubercle; lumbar subsegment of spinal cord; pontine nuclei; Epithelium of choroid plexus; More reference expression data
BioGPS	More reference expression data
Gene ontology
Molecular function	sodium-independent organic anion transmembrane transporter activity; transmembrane transporter activity; inorganic anion exchanger activity; transporter activity
Cellular component	integral component of membrane; plasma membrane; basolateral plasma membrane; integral component of plasma membrane; extracellular exosome; membrane
Biological process	sodium-independent organic anion transport; ion transport; response to toxic substance; transmembrane transport; anion transmembrane transport; inorganic anion transport; transport
Sources:Amigo / QuickGO
Orthologs
Databases	NCBI: entry; OMA: entry
Species	Human	Mouse
Entrez	9376	19879
Ensembl	ENSG00000149452	ENSMUSG00000063796
UniProt	Q8TCC7	O88909
RefSeq (mRNA)	NM_001184732; NM_001184733; NM_001184736; NM_004254	NM_001164634; NM_001164635; NM_031194
RefSeq (protein)	NP_001171661; NP_001171662; NP_001171665; NP_004245	NP_001158106; NP_001158107; NP_112471
Location (UCSC)	Chr 11: 62.99 – 63.02 Mb	Chr 19: 8.57 – 8.59 Mb
PubMed search
- Wikidata
View/Edit Human	View/Edit Mouse

Solute carrier family 22 member 8, or organic anion transporter 3 (OAT3), is a protein that in humans is encoded by the SLC22A8 gene.

== Function ==
OAT3 is involved in the transport and excretion of organic ions some of which are drugs (e.g., penicillin G (benzylpenicillin), methotrexate (MTX), indomethacin (an NSAID), and ciprofloxacin (a fluoroquinolone antibiotic)) and some of which are pure toxicants. SLC22A8 (OAT3) is indirectly dependent on the inward sodium gradient, which is a driving force for reentry of dicarboxylates into the cytosol. Dicarboxylates, such as alpha-ketoglutarate generated within the cell, or recycled from the extracellular space, are used as exchange substrates to fuel the influx of organic anions against their concentration gradient. The encoded protein is an integral membrane protein and appears to be localized to the basolateral membrane of renal proximal tubule cells.
