= Percutaneous transhepatic cholangiography =

Medical imaging of the biliary tract

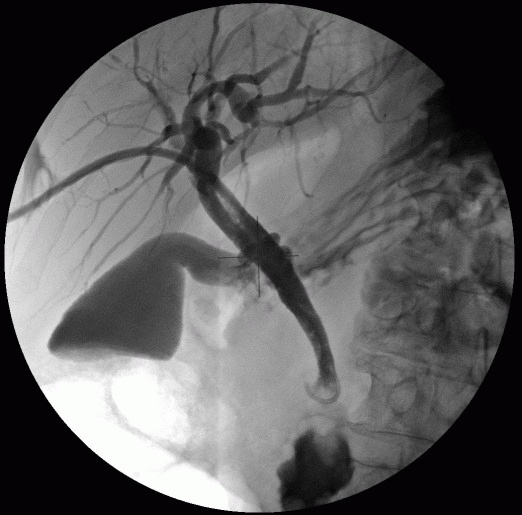
- Percutaneous transhepatic cholangiography
- Other names: Percutaneous hepatic cholangiogram
- ICD-9-CM: 87.51
- OPS-301 code: 3-13c.1

Percutaneous transhepatic cholangiography, percutaneous hepatic cholangiogram (PTHC) is a radiological technique used to visualize the anatomy of the biliary tract. A contrast medium is injected into a bile duct in the liver, after which X-rays are taken. It allows access to the biliary tree in cases where endoscopic retrograde cholangiopancreatography has been unsuccessful. Initially reported in 1937, the procedure became popular in 1952.

== Uses ==
Some uses for this procedure includes: drainage of bile/infected bile to relieve obstructive jaundice, to place a stent to dilate a stricture in the biliary system, stone removal, and rendezvous technique where guidewire from the common bile duct (CBD) meets with duodenoscope (coming from the oesophagus into the stomach and then duodenum) at the major duodenal papilla. In this rendezvous technique, the guidewire is then pulled into duodenoscope and a small blade is slid over the guidewire into the CBD and perform surgeries on a specific bile duct in the biliary system. PTHC is frequently performed guide therapy of the biliary system. Rarely it is used for diagnostic purposes only.

PTHC is also used in the drainage of unruptured or uncomplicated hydatid cysts. Rarely, PTHC is used in the drainage of ruptured hydatid cysts.

== Contraindications ==
Among the contraindications are: increased bleeding tendency where platelets less than 100 × 10^{9}/litre and prothrombin time prolonged more than 2 seconds than the control. This procedure is also contraindicated in biliary tract sepsis, except to control the infection by drainage of the infected bile.

== Technique ==
Low osmolar contrast medium is used in this procedure with concentration of 150 mg/ml with 20 to 60 ml volume. Those who undergoes the procedure needs to be fasted for four hours before the procedure. Besides, antibiotics such as ciprofloxacin 500 mg to 750 mg can be given as antibiotic prophylaxis to prevent infection during the procedure. Sedation (to reduce irritability and agitation of the subject during procedure) with analgesia (painkillers) and vital signs monitoring should be set up. Before the procedure, bedside ultrasound is done to confirm the position of the dilated bile ducts in the liver. The puncture site is then marked. Bile ducts of the right liver is located in the intercostal spaces between anterior and mid axillary lines. Meanwhile, the bile ducts in the left lobe of the liver is located to the left side of the xiphisternum on the epigastric region.

The number of attempts made to pass Chiba needle into the biliary tract does not affect the rate of complication but the likehood of success is related to the degree of dilatation of the biliary tract (larger dilatation means needle is easier to find its way into the biliary tract) and total number of attempts made.

Excessive contrast media injection into the liver should be avoided. When there is excessive injection into the liver, lymphatics within the liver will be opacified with contrast medium. Injection of the contrast medium into an artery or vein will cause the contrast to dispersed quickly due to blood flow.

Cholangiography during a biliary drainage intervention is called perioperative or primary choloangiography, and when performed later in the same drain it is called secondary cholangiography.

== Complications ==
Percutaneous transhepatic cholangiography may increase the incidence of metastasis, tube dislocation, and bleeding when compared to endoscopic biliary drainage. However, it has lower rate of cholangitis, pancreatitis when compared to endoscopic biliary drainage, probably because the latter has higher chance of incomplete drainage of infected bile, or accidental resection of papilla that causes the backflow of infected bile from the duodenum into the biliary system.

== Percutaneous transhepatic biliary drainage ==
Percutaneous transhepatic biliary drainage (PTBD) is often performed if endoscopic retrograde biliary drainage (ERBD) is unsuccessful for biliary obstructions due to hepatocellular carcinoma. ERBD is the first line treatment because of its low bleeding risk. For biliary obstruction at the hilum (meeting point of right and hepatic hepatic ducts), both ERBD and PTBD can be done depending on subject's clinical circumstances and physician's preference.

== Percutaneous extraction of retained biliary calculi ==
=== Percutaneous transhepatic technique ===
This procedure is indicated when endoscopic retrograde cholangiopancreatography (ERCP), papillotomy (cutting through major duodenal papilla to relieve stenosis) or stone removal are unsuccessful. This procedure is also indicated when endoscopic access is difficult in case where there is major modification of the stomach and small intestine such as Billroth II stomach resection, and other conditions such as intradiverticular papilla (duodenal papilla located inside a duodenal outpouching), stenosis of the duodenal papilla, stone within the distal CBD, stenosis of ampulla of Vater, stone in the peripheral bile duct, or stone larger than 15 mm.

Biliary calculi is seen on cholangiogram done on T-tube that was previously inserted into CBD. This happens in 3% of the cases post surgical management of biliary stones. This procedure is contraindicated if T-tube is too small (less than 12 French in size), tortous T tube in tissues, acute pancreatitis, and when there is another drain that is connected to the T-tube tract.

PTBD is done one to two weeks before the procedure to reduce oedema of the biliary ducts and sphincter of Oddi oedema.

Either high osmolar contrast medium or low osmolar contrast medium can be used (with concentration of 150 mg/ml). Low density contrast medium is used to prevent obscuring of the calculus. Antibiotic prophylaxis and pre-medication is given one hour before the procedure. Painkillers is given during the procedure. The subject lie down in supine position on the table. PTHC is performed if biliary drainage catheter is not in-situ. The drainage catheter is then removed over the guidewire and sheath is inserted into the ducts (7 to 8 French size). Contrast is then injected through the sheath to identify any stones or strictures. If a stricture is identified, put in biliary manipulation catheter with guidewire measuring 0.035 inches and commence balloon dilatation (with balloon sizes of 8, 10, and 12 mm). Using the balloon catheter, the stones are pushed into the duodenum. If the stones are difficult to push, Dormier basket is used to push them into the duodenum. The basket is removed and guidewire is inserted back into the sheath. The sheath is then removed and biliary drainage catheter is inserted back through the guidewire. Contrast is then injected intermittently through the drainage catheter to follow-up on the position of the stones.

After the procedure, pulse and blood pressure are monitored half-hourly for six hours. The subject put on bed rest for a total of four to six hours.

Possible complications include allergic reaction to the contrast and inflammation of the pancreas. There can also be perforation of the T-tube tract.

=== Trans T-tube technique ===
Post-operative T-tube cholangiography is performed on the 10th day post operation where either high osmolar or low osmolar contrast media with concentration of 150 mg/ml with volume of 20 to 30 ml is injected through the T-tube to determine if there is any leak from the biliary tract or remaining stones within the biliary system.

Trans T-tube technique of stone extraction also known as Burhene technique. This procedure is done after 5 to 8 weeks post abdominal operation for the maturation of the T-tube tract when fibrous tissue is formed at its walls to support the tract and keep the tract open. Guidewire is then advanced through the T-tube before the T-tube is removed. Then a catheter is inserted over the guidewire and cholangiogram is performed to visualise the anatomy of the biliary tract and the positions of the stones.
