= SLCO1B1 =

Protein found in humans

An Error has occurred retrieving Wikidata item for infobox Solute carrier organic anion transporter family member 1B1 is a protein that in humans is encoded by the SLCO1B1 gene. Pharmacogenomic research indicates that genetic variations in this gene are associated with response to simvastatin. Clinical guidelines exist that can guide dosing of simvastatin based on SLCO1B1 gene variant using genotyping or whole exome sequencing.

== See also ==
- Solute carrier family
