= Cholangiocyte =

Cuboidal epithelial cell of the bile duct

Details
- System: Biliary system
- Location: Bile duct
- Function: Epithelium

Identifiers
- Latin: cholangiocytus
- TH: H3.04.05.0.00011
- FMA: 86481

Cholangiocytes are the epithelial cells of the bile duct. They are cuboidal epithelium in the small interlobular bile ducts, but become columnar and carbonate-secreting in larger bile ducts approaching the porta hepatis and the extrahepatic ducts. They contribute to hepatocyte survival by transporting bile acids.

== Function ==
In the healthy liver, cholangiocytes contribute to bile secretion via release of bicarbonate and water. Several hormones and locally acting mediators are known to contribute to cholangiocyte fluid/electrolyte secretion. These include secretin, acetylcholine, ATP, and bombesin.

Cholangiocytes act through bile-acid independent bile flow, which is driven by the active transport of electrolytes. In contrast, hepatocytes secrete bile through bile-acid dependent bile flow, which is coupled to canalicular secretion of bile acids via ATP-driven transporters. This results in passive transcellular and paracellular secretion of fluid and electrolytes through an osmotic effect.

== Clinical significance ==
Disordered functioning of cholangiocytes is at the center of a variety of pathological conditions known as "cholangiopathies." These diseases include primary biliary cirrhosis, primary sclerosing cholangitis, AIDS cholangiopathy, disappearing bile duct syndromes, Alagille's syndrome, cystic fibrosis, and biliary atresia. Often either the best or the only curative treatment option for cholangiopathies is liver transplantation, and as a group, cholangiopathies account for a substantial percentage of both adult and pediatric liver transplants.

== Research ==
Active scientific investigation of cholangiocytes focuses on such diverse processes as mechanisms of fluid/electrolyte secretion, regulation of cholangiocyte proliferation, roles of cholangiocytes in the pathogenesis of liver fibrosis and cirrhosis, and cholangiocyte apoptosis. Specific investigation of individual cholangiopathies is also pursued actively.
