= Bile canaliculus =

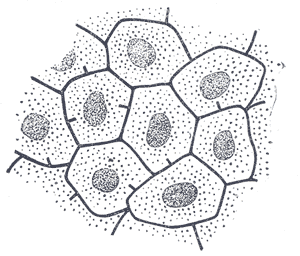
- Bile capillaries of rabbit (shown by Golgi's method with 450 x magnification)

Details

Identifiers
- Latin: canaliculi biliferi
- MeSH: D001648

A bile canaliculus (pl.: bile canaliculi; also called bile capillaries) is a thin tube that collects bile secreted by hepatocytes. The bile canaliculi empty into a series of progressively larger bile ductules and ducts, which eventually become common hepatic duct. The bile canaliculi empty directly into the canals of Hering.

Hepatocytes are polyhedral in shape, therefore having no set shape or design, although they are made of cuboidal epithelial cells. They have surfaces facing the sinusoids (called sinusoidal faces) and surfaces which contact other hepatocytes (called lateral faces). Bile canaliculi are formed by grooves on some of the lateral faces of these hepatocytes.

Microvilli are present in the canaliculi.
