= ATP-binding cassette sub-family C member 2 =

Protein found in humans

ABCC2

Identifiers
- Aliases: ABCC2, ABC30, CMOAT, DJS, MRP2, cMRP, Multidrug resistance-associated protein 2, ATP binding cassette subfamily C member 2
- External IDs: OMIM: 601107; MGI: 1352447; GeneCards: ABCC2
Enzyme activity
EC #	BRENDA	ExPASy	KEGG	MetaCyc
7.6.2.2	↗	↗	↗	↗
7.6.2.3	↗	↗	↗	↗

Gene location (Human)
Chr.	Chromosome 10 (human)
Band	10q24.2	Start	99,782,640 bp
Band	10q24.2	End	99,852,594 bp

Gene location (Mouse)
Chr.	Chromosome 19 (mouse)
Band	19 C3|19 36.67 cM	Start	43,770,631 bp
Band	19 C3|19 36.67 cM	End	43,829,179 bp
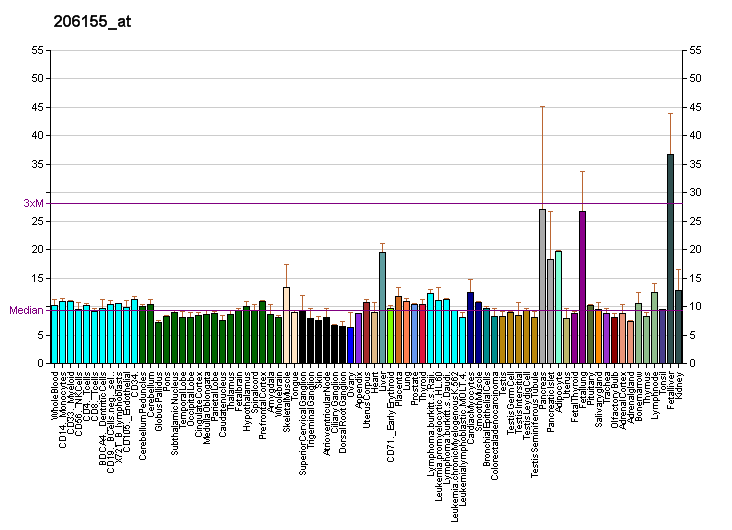
RNA expression pattern
Bgee	Human / Mouse (ortholog); Top expressed in: right lobe of liver; jejunal mucosa; gallbladder; duodenum; human kidney; mucosa of ileum; testicle; tibial nerve; gonad; sural nerve / Top expressed in: left lobe of liver; duodenum; right kidney; proximal tubule; jejunum; human kidney; yolk sac; epithelium of small intestine; ileum; migratory enteric neural crest cell; More reference expression data
BioGPS	More reference expression data
Gene ontology
Molecular function	ATPase activity; nucleotide binding; protein binding; ATP binding; transporter activity; protein domain specific binding; ATPase-coupled transmembrane transporter activity; organic anion transmembrane transporter activity; ATPase-coupled inorganic anion transmembrane transporter activity; bilirubin transmembrane transporter activity; transmembrane transporter activity
Cellular component	integral component of membrane; membrane; cell surface; plasma membrane; apical plasma membrane; brush border membrane; intercellular canaliculus; integral component of plasma membrane
Biological process	response to steroid hormone; response to arsenic-containing substance; prostaglandin transport; response to methotrexate; thyroid hormone transport; xenobiotic transmembrane transport; transmembrane transport; cellular chloride ion homeostasis; response to oxidative stress; response to estrogen; response to heat; bilirubin transport; female pregnancy; mercury ion transport; canalicular bile acid transport; antibiotic metabolic process; cellular response to lipopolysaccharide; cellular response to interleukin-1; cellular response to interleukin-6; cellular response to tumor necrosis factor; cellular response to dexamethasone stimulus; response to antineoplastic agent; benzylpenicillin metabolic process; cellular response to hormone stimulus; transport; organic anion transport; response to lipopolysaccharide; response to glucagon
Sources:Amigo / QuickGO
Orthologs
Databases	NCBI: entry; OMA: entry
Species	Human	Mouse
Entrez	1244	12780
Ensembl	ENSG00000023839	ENSMUSG00000025194
UniProt	Q92887	Q8VI47
RefSeq (mRNA)	NM_000392	NM_013806
RefSeq (protein)	NP_000383	NP_038834
Location (UCSC)	Chr 10: 99.78 – 99.85 Mb	Chr 19: 43.77 – 43.83 Mb
PubMed search
- Wikidata
View/Edit Human	View/Edit Mouse

ATP-binding cassette sub-family C member 2 (ABCC2) is a protein that in humans is encoded by the ABCC2 gene. ABCC2 is also known as Multidrug resistance-associated protein 2 (MRP2) and canalicular multispecific organic anion transporter 1 (cMOAT).

== Function ==
MRP2 is a member of the superfamily of ATP-binding cassette (ABC) transporters. ABC proteins transport various molecules across extra- and intra-cellular membranes. ABC genes are divided into seven distinct subfamilies (ABC1, MDR/TAP, MRP, ALD, OABP, GCN20, White). More specifically, this protein is a member of the MRP subfamily, which is involved in multi-drug resistance. This protein is expressed in the canalicular (apical) part of the hepatocyte and functions in biliary transport. Substrates include anticancer drugs such as vinblastine; therefore, this protein appears to contribute to drug resistance in mammalian cells.

MRP2 is also expressed in the apical membrane of proximal renal tubule endothelial cells where they are involved in the excretion of small organic anions.

== MRP2 inhibitors ==
Drug	Class	Indications	Source	Structure
probenecid	uricosuric	gout hyperuricemia		
furosemide	loop diuretic	heart failure edema		
ritonavir	protease inhibitor	antiretroviral		
saquinavir	protease inhibitor	antiretroviral		
lamivudine	Nucleoside analog	antiviral		
abacavir	Nucleoside analog	antiretroviral		
emtricitabine	Nucleoside analog	antiviral		
efavirenz	NNRTI	antiretroviral		
delavirdine	NNRTI	antiretroviral		
nevirapine	NNRTI	antiretroviral		
cidofovir	nucleoside phosphonate	antiviral		
adefovir	nucleoside phosphonate	antiviral		
tenofovir	nucleoside phosphonate	antiviral		

== Clinical significance ==
=== Dubin–Johnson syndrome ===
Several different mutations in this gene have been observed in patients with Dubin–Johnson syndrome (DJS), an autosomal recessive disorder characterized by conjugated hyperbilirubinemia.

=== Iatrogenic Fanconi syndrome ===
Many negatively charged metabolic waste products are eliminated from the body by the kidneys. These organic anions are transported from the blood into the endothelial cells of the renal proximal tubules by the OAT1 transporter. From there, these waste molecules are transported into the lumen of the tubule by the MRP2 transporter. Many drugs are eliminated from the body by this mechanism. Some of these drugs pass through the MRP2 transporter slowly. This may cause a buildup of organic anions in the cytoplasm of the cells.

Drugs that inhibit the MRP2 transporter can cause a buildup of organic anions inside renal proximal tubule cells. If some of these organic anions inhibit mitochondrial DNA synthesis, it may cause iatrogenic Fanconi syndrome. The nucleoside phosphonate adefovir is a MRP2 inhibitor that has been linked to kidney disease. Tenofovir and cidofovir are also nucleoside phosphonates that inhibit MRP2 and have been associated with Fanconi syndrome.

== Interactive pathway map ==
Click on genes, proteins and metabolites below to link to respective articles. (Note: The interactive pathway map can be edited at WikiPathways: "IrinotecanPathway_WP229".)

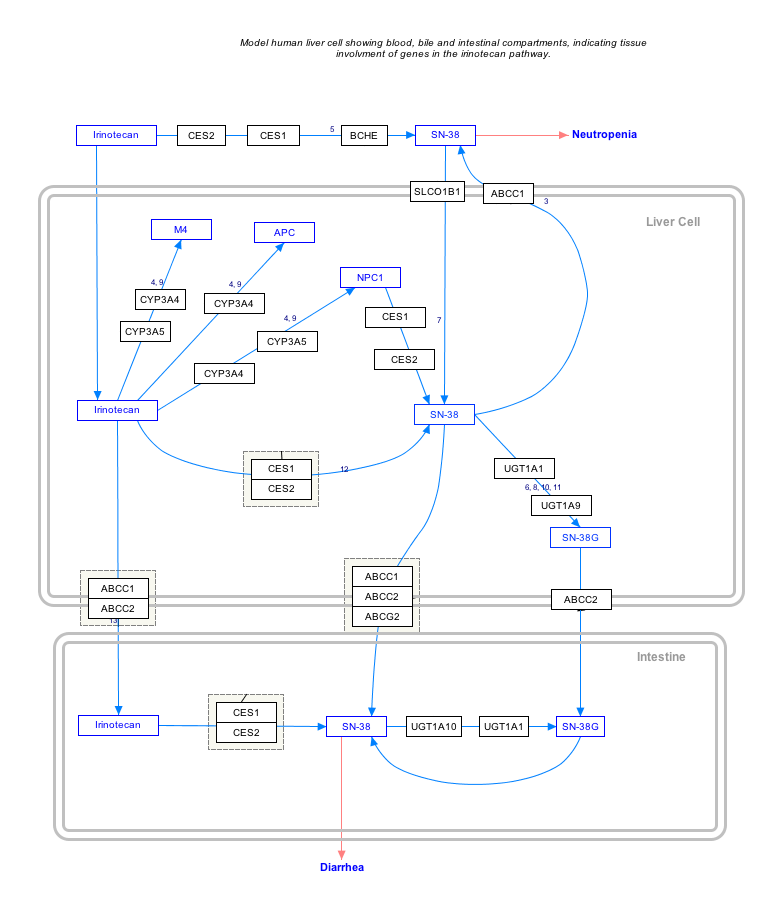

Irinotecan Pathway edit
