= Hereditary hyperbilirubinemia =

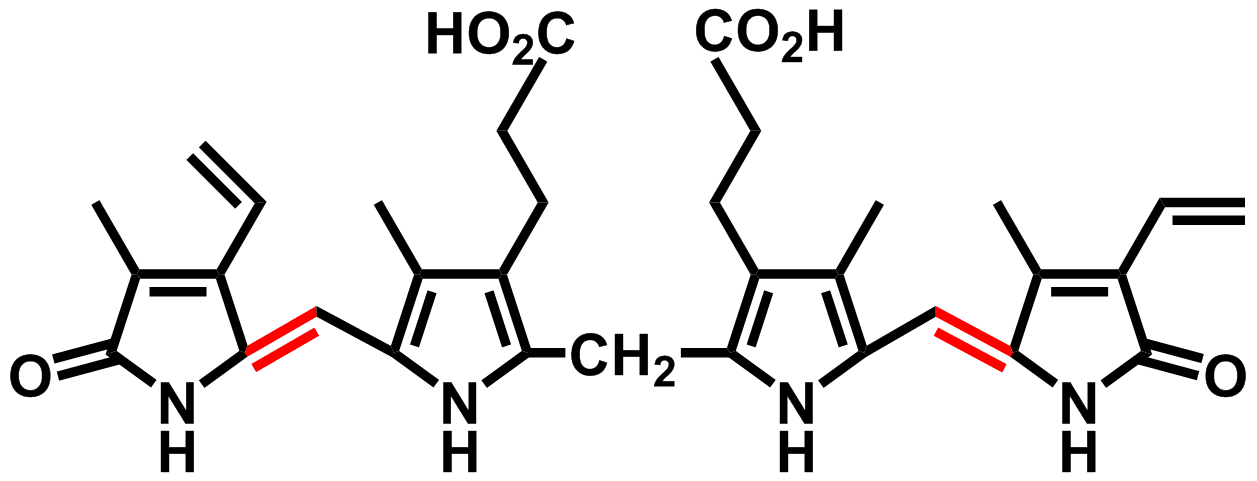
- Bilirubin levels are increased by this condition
- Specialty: Endocrinology

Hereditary hyperbilirubinemia refers to a group of conditions where levels of bilirubin, a byproduct of red blood cell metabolism, are elevated in the blood due to a genetic cause. Various mutations of enzymes in the liver cells, which break down bilirubin, cause varying elevated levels of bilirubin in the blood. These disorders may cause yellowing of the skin and eyes, called jaundice.

The prevalence of hereditary hyperbilirubinemia varies based on each disease. The most common being Gilbert syndrome which is found is 2-10% of the population. Other types of hereditary hyperbilirubinemia are less common and may even be exceedingly rare depending on the mutation.

These conditions are conventionally split into conjugated or unconjugated hyperbilirubinemias based on where the enzyme mutation occurs in bilirubin metabolism. Unconjugated bilirubin is byproduct of red blood cell break down from the spleen which is not water soluble and is transported via albumin to the liver. Once in the liver it becomes conjugated and water soluble and easier to excrete via the gastrointestinal tract in bile.

== Symptoms and signs ==
Hyperbilirubinemia can cause a yellowing of the skin called jaundice depending on the level of bilirubin in the blood. Additional symptoms of hyperbilirubinemia include darker urine (bilirubinuria) due to increased unconjugated bilirubin removed from the body in urine. Another symptom is pale stools (acholic stool) due to a lack of bilirubin excretion in the gastrointestinal system. Depending on a patient's genetic mutation they may be asymptomatic, have severe symptoms requiring hospitalization or experience death.

Depending on the type of hereditary hyperbilirubinemia, symptoms can be worsened when an additional cause of increased red blood cell turnover occurs, as these patients have a decreased ability to process bilirubin. Elevated levels of unconjugated bilirubin is neurotoxic and can cause damage to the brain, called bilirubin encephalopathy which can progress to chronic damage called kernicterus which most often occurs in Crigler-Najjar syndrome.

Symptoms often occur in newborns as they have red blood cells with decreased lifespans and increased blood concentrations causing increased bilirubin production. The most severe symptom of hyperbilirubinemia in newborns is kernicterus or death.

== Causes ==
The four most common causes of hereditary hyperbilirubinemia include Gilbert syndrome, Crigler-Najjar syndrome, Dubin-Johnson syndrome, and Rotor syndrome. There are additional rare causes of hereditary hyperbilirubinemia like Lucey-Driscoll syndrome and Heme Oxygenase-1 Deficiency.

Both Gilbert syndrome and Crigler-Najjar syndrome cause an elevated unconjugated bilirubin level due to mutations in the UGT1A1 gene, which conjugates bilirubin within liver cells so it can be excreted. Gilbert Syndrome is a partial reduction in UGT1A1's activity which causes transient hyperbilirubinemia during various stressors, like fasting or acute illness. Gilbert syndrome is inherited in both autosomal dominant and autosomal recession nature. Crigler-Najjar syndrome is much more severe and presents in newborns. Crigler-Najjar syndrome is the complete or near complete inactivity absence of UGT1A1 activity a more severe unconjugated hyperbilirubinemia compared to Gilbert Syndrome.

Dubin-Johnson syndrome and Rotor syndrome cause elevations in conjugated bilirubin. These conditions are caused by mutations in the enzymes which transport bilirubin in and out of cells. Dubin-Johnson syndrome is caused by mutations in ABCC2/MRP2 which usually transports conjugated bilirubin out of the liver cell. Rotor syndrome is clinically similar to Dubin-Johnson syndrome but can cause a mixed hyperbilirubinemia, elevating both unconjugated and conjugated bilirubin levels in the blood. Rotor syndrome is caused by a deficiency in bilirubin transportation of hepatic uptake and storage. Both Dubin-Johnson and Rotor syndrome do not cause severe hyperbilirubinemia.

== Diagnosis ==
Diagnosis can often be difficult due to the nonspecific symptoms that these conditions present with and the variety in prevalence. Additionally, diagnosis is also made more difficult by these conditions often presenting due to overlying secondary conditions like increased red blood cell turnover or increased stress on the body which may be required to reveal certain mutations.

Due to the genetic nature of these conditions, taking a family history is important. Additionally, diagnosis can be made clinically depending on the timing and severity of elevated bilirubin and ratio of conjugate to unconjugated bilirubin. All of which can reveal how severe the enzymatic deficiency and narrow down the potential enzymes which may be deficient.

For many of these conditions genetic test may be required for definitive diagnosis. Due to many of the conditions having multiple mutations which can cause the enzyme deficiencies, gene analysis and genetic sequencing may be required.

== Management ==
Management of hereditary hyperbilirubinemia can range from not requiring acute interventions with Gilbert Disease to requiring acute hospitalization for more severe mutations like Crigler-Najjar syndrome. For more severe hereditary hyperbilirubinemia's, treatments include exchange transfusions to remove excess bilirubin, UV light therapy to convert unconjugated bilirubin to conjugated and allow for excretion, and use of certain medications like phenobarbitol or ursodeoxycholic acid. For certain conditions the only curative treatment is a liver transplant. There is potential in the future for gene editing treatments for the most severe hereditary hyperbilirubinemias.
