= Liver failure =

Inability of the liver to perform its normal functions

- Other names: Hepatic insufficiency, liver dysfunction
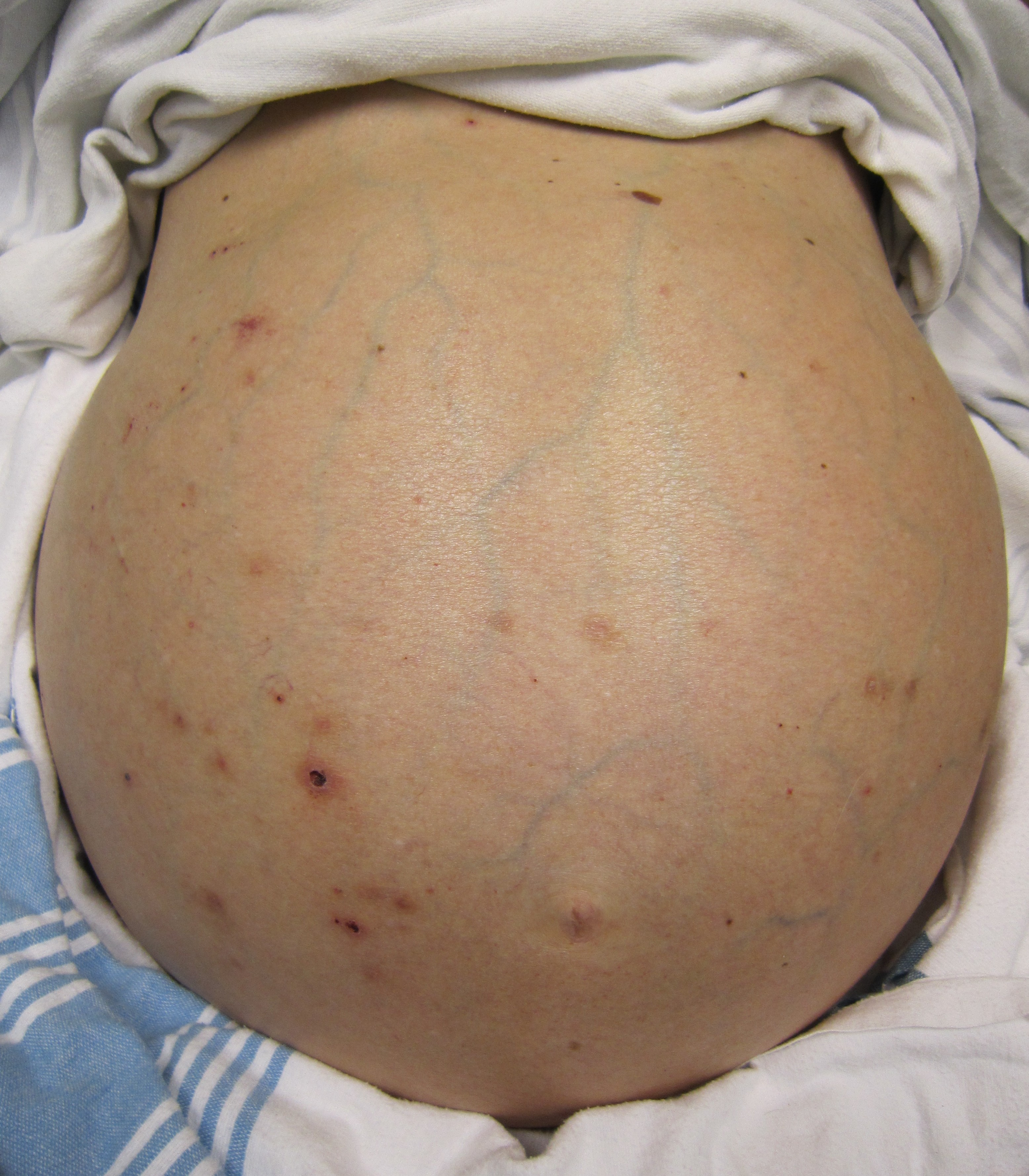
- A person with massive ascites and caput medusae due to cirrhotic liver failure
- Specialty: Gastroenterology, hepatology
- Symptoms: Abdominal inflammation, fluid retention, hyperglycemia, nausea, vomiting, jaundice, acute or chronic fatigue, hyponatremia, hypokalemia, respiratory alkalosis, metabolic acidosis, bilirubinuria, glycosuria, pruritus
- Risk factors: Excessive consumption of alcohol, fatty foods; obesity; type 2 diabetes; anabolic steroids; sharing or reusing syringes

Liver failure is the inability of the liver to perform its normal synthetic and metabolic functions as part of normal physiology. Two forms are recognised, acute and chronic (cirrhosis). Recently, a third form of liver failure known as acute-on-chronic liver failure (ACLF) is increasingly being recognized.

== Acute ==
Acute liver failure is defined as "the rapid development of hepatocellular dysfunction, specifically coagulopathy and mental status changes (encephalopathy) in a patient without known prior liver disease".^{:1557}

The disease process is associated with the development of a coagulopathy of liver aetiology, and clinically apparent altered level of consciousness due to hepatic encephalopathy. Several important measures are immediately necessary when the patient presents for medical attention. The diagnosis of acute liver failure is based on a physical exam, laboratory findings, patient history, and past medical history to establish mental status changes, coagulopathy, rapidity of onset, and absence of known prior liver disease respectively.^{:1557}

The exact definition of "rapid" is somewhat debatable, and different sub-divisions exist, which are based on the time from onset of first hepatic symptoms to onset of encephalopathy. One scheme defines "acute hepatic failure" as the development of encephalopathy within 26 weeks of the onset of any hepatic symptoms. This is sub-divided into "fulminant hepatic failure", which requires onset of encephalopathy within 8 weeks, and "subfulminant", which describes onset of encephalopathy after 8 weeks but before 26 weeks. Another scheme defines "hyperacute" as onset within 7 days, "acute" as onset between 7 and 28 days, and "subacute" as onset between 28 days and 24 weeks.^{:1557}

== Chronic ==
Chronic liver failure usually occurs in the context of cirrhosis, itself potentially the result of many possible causes, such as excessive alcohol intake, hepatitis B or C, autoimmune, hereditary and metabolic causes (such as iron or copper overload, steatohepatitis or non-alcoholic fatty liver disease).

== Acute on chronic ==
Acute-on-chronic liver failure (ACLF) is said to exist when someone with chronic liver disease develops features of liver failure. A number of underlying causes may precipitate this, such as alcohol misuse or infection. People with ACLF can be critically ill and require intensive care treatment, and occasionally a liver transplant. Mortality with treatment is 50%.
