= Crigler =

Crigler may refer to:

- Crigler (surname)
- Crigler Mound Group, an archaeological site in the northeastern part of the U.S. state of Missouri
- Crigler–Najjar syndrome or CNS, a rare inherited disorder affecting the metabolism of bilirubin, a chemical formed from the breakdown of the heme in red blood cells.
