= UDPGT =

UDPGT may refer to:

- Glucuronosyltransferase, an enzyme
- UDP glucuronosyltransferase 1 family, polypeptide A1, an enzyme
