= Arturo Rotor =

Filipino doctor (1907–1988)

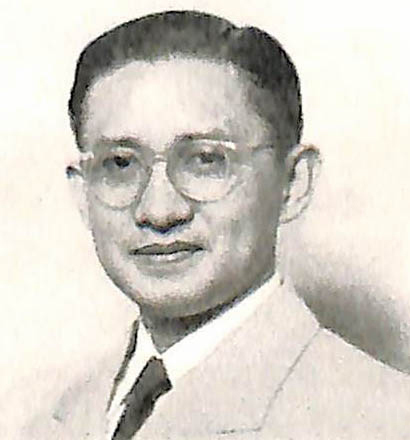

3rd Executive Secretary of the Philippines
- In office June 13, 1942 – November 30, 1944
- President: Manuel L. Quezon
- Preceded by: Manuel Roxas
- Succeeded by: Jose S. Reyes

Personal details
- Born: June 7, 1907 Qiuapo, Manila, Philippine Islands
- Died: April 9, 1988 (aged 80)
- Spouse: Emma Adela Unson (m. 1940)
- Profession: Doctor, musician, writer, government official

Arturo Belleza Rotor (June 7, 1907 – April 9, 1988) was a Filipino medical doctor, civil servant, musician, and writer.

== Medical and government career ==
Rotor was born in the Philippines and attended the University of the Philippines. He graduated simultaneously from the Conservatory of Music and the College of Medicine. He trained further at Johns Hopkins University's medical school, publishing a paper on a rare form of hyperbilirubinaemia (jaundice) now known as "Rotor syndrome".

During World War II, Rotor served as executive secretary of the Philippine Commonwealth government-in-exile under Manuel L. Quezon, the Philippine president in exile. In the immediate post-World War II period, he was appointed secretary of the Department of Health and Welfare. Later, Rotor was director of the University of the Philippines' Postgraduate School of Medicine and was a practising physician until the early 1980s.

== Writing career ==
Rotor was an internationally respected writer of fiction and non-fiction in English. He is widely considered among the best Filipino short story writers of the twentieth century. He was a charter member of the Philippine Book Guild; the guild's initial publication (1937) was Rotor's The Wound and the Scar, despite Rotor's protests that someone else's work should have been selected. In 1966, the Philippine government recognized his literary accomplishments by awarding him the Republic Cultural Heritage Award. Rotor's best-known literary works are The Wound and the Scar (1937), Confidentially, Doctor (1965), Selected Stories from the Wound and the Scar (1973), The Men Who Play God (1983), and the short stories "Dahong Palay" (1928) and "Zita" (1930).

== Orchids ==
He was an orchid fancier and breeder, a long-time member of the Philippine Orchid Society, and is the namesake of a Vanda orchid species (Vanda merillii var. rotorii). Rotor shared an interest in orchids with his younger brother, Gavino B. Rotor Jr. Gavino took this interest even further, receiving his Ph.D. from Cornell University on orchid biology and becoming an authority on orchid propagation. The orchid genus Rotorara is named after Gavino.

== Other interests ==
Rotor was a highly accomplished musician and published music critic.

== Personal ==
Rotor died in 1988 from cancer and was survived by his wife, scientist Emma Unson, who taught college mathematics and physics. They had no children. In 1944, Emma joined the Ordinance Development Division of the National Bureau of Standards as a physicist for their weapons research program, and is credited with research as part of the development of the proximity fuse.
