= Choluria =

- Choluria. Urine test strip shows a high levels of the bilirubin and urobilinogen.
- Specialty: Gastroenterology

Choluria (or bilirubinuria) is a symptom defining an abnormal darkness of the urine, mainly due to a high level of conjugated bilirubin. Choluria is a common symptom of liver diseases, such as hepatitis and cirrhosis. It can be described as dark or brown urine, often referred to as the color of cola. The presence of choluria is a useful symptom to distinguish if somebody presenting with jaundice has liver disease (direct hyperbilirubinaemia) or haemolysis (indirect hyperbilirubinaemia). In the first case, patients have choluria due to excess conjugated ("direct") bilirubin in blood, which is eliminated by the kidneys. Haemolysis, on the other hand, is characterized by unconjugated ("indirect") bilirubin, which is not water-soluble and is bound to albumin, and thus not eliminated in urine.

== See also ==
- Acholia
