= Biliverdin reductase A =

Protein-coding gene in the species Homo sapiens

biliverdin reductase A
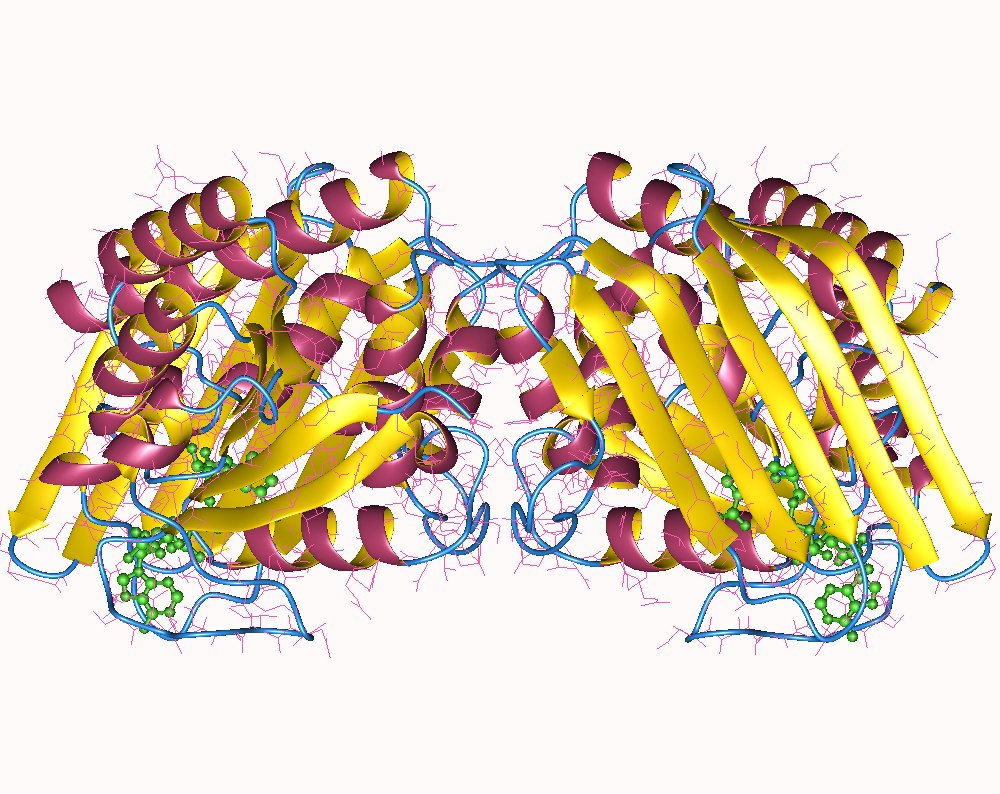
- Biliverdin reductase A dimer, Human

Identifiers
- EC no.: 1.3.1.24

Databases
- IntEnz: IntEnz view
- BRENDA: BRENDA entry
- ExPASy: NiceZyme view
- KEGG: KEGG entry
- MetaCyc: metabolic pathway
- PRIAM: profile
- PDB structures: RCSB PDB PDBe PDBsum
Search
- PMC: articles
- PubMed: articles
- NCBI: proteins

BLVRA
Available structures
PDB	Ortholog search: PDBe RCSB
PDB	List of PDB id codes 2H63

Identifiers
- Aliases: BLVRA, BLVR, BVR, BVRA, biliverdin reductase A
- External IDs: OMIM: 109750; MGI: 88170; HomoloGene: 572; GeneCards: BLVRA; OMA:BLVRA - orthologs

Gene location (Human)
Chr.	Chromosome 7 (human)
Band	7p13	Start	43,758,680 bp
Band	7p13	End	43,807,342 bp

Gene location (Mouse)
Chr.	Chromosome 2 (mouse)
Band	2 F1|2 61.76 cM	Start	126,912,585 bp
Band	2 F1|2 61.76 cM	End	126,939,004 bp
RNA expression pattern
Bgee	Human / Mouse (ortholog); Top expressed in: monocyte; epithelium of esophagus; middle temporal gyrus; gingival epithelium; corpus epididymis; glomerulus; spleen; metanephric glomerulus; olfactory zone of nasal mucosa; right lung / Top expressed in: right kidney; proximal tubule; facial motor nucleus; stroma of bone marrow; human kidney; endothelial cell of lymphatic vessel; transitional epithelium of urinary bladder; carotid body; calvaria; vestibular sensory epithelium; More reference expression data
BioGPS	n/a
Gene ontology
Molecular function	protein binding; metal ion binding; zinc ion binding; oxidoreductase activity; biliverdin reductase (NAD(P)+) activity
Cellular component	extracellular exosome; cytoplasm; cytosol
Biological process	heme catabolic process
Sources:Amigo / QuickGO
Orthologs
Species	Human	Mouse
Entrez	644	109778
Ensembl	ENSG00000106605	ENSMUSG00000001999
UniProt	P53004	Q9CY64
RefSeq (mRNA)	NM_000712; NM_001253823	NM_026678
RefSeq (protein)	NP_000703; NP_001240752	NP_080954
Location (UCSC)	Chr 7: 43.76 – 43.81 Mb	Chr 2: 126.91 – 126.94 Mb
PubMed search
- Wikidata
View/Edit Human	View/Edit Mouse

Biliverdin reductase A is a protein that in humans is encoded by the BLVRA gene.

== Function ==
The protein encoded by this gene belongs to the biliverdin reductase family, members of which catalyze the conversion of biliverdin to bilirubin in the presence of NADPH or NADH.

== Clinical significance ==
Mutations in this gene are associated with hyperbiliverdinemia.
