= BVR (disambiguation) =

BVR may refer to:

- Beyond-visual-range missile an air-to-air missile
- Biliverdin reductase, an enzyme
- Buffalo Volunteer Rifles, an infantry regiment of the South African Army
- Bundesverband der Deutschen Volksbanken und Raiffeisenbanken (Federal Association of German 'Volksbanken und Raiffeisenbanken' Co-operative Banks)
- Bure Valley Railway, a narrow-gauge heritage railway in Norfolk, England
