= Emma Unson Rotor =

Filipino-American physicist and mathematician (1913–1998)

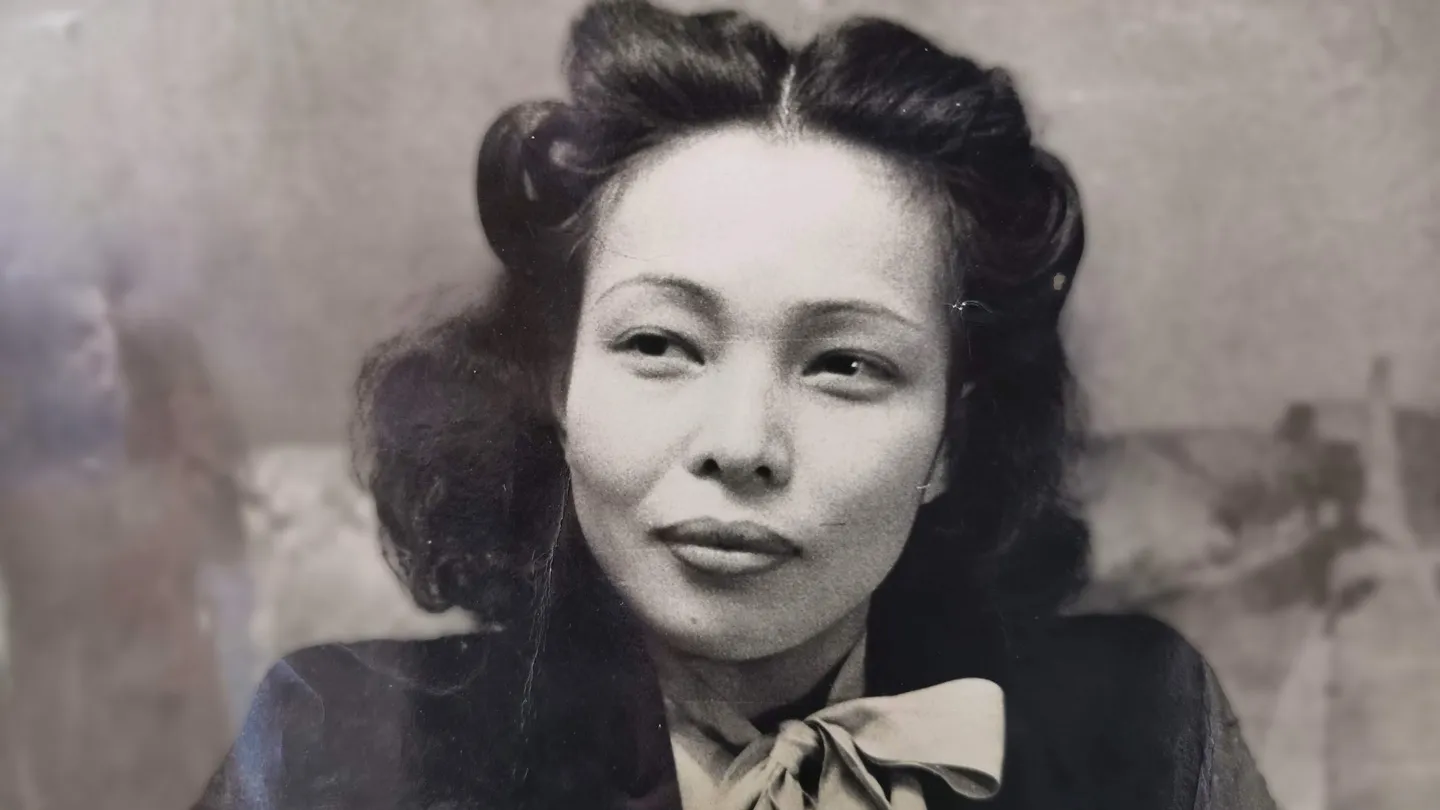
- Born: Emma Adela Locsin Unson; May 18, 1913; Manila, Philippines
- Died: September 6, 1998 (aged 85)
- Education: Bachelors (mathematics); Masters (1937) (physics)
- Alma mater: University of Santo Tomas, Manila, Philippines
- Known for: Proximity fuze
- Spouse: Arturo Rotor (m. 1940; died 1988)
- Scientific career
- Workplaces: National Bureau of Standards (NBS)

Emma Adela Unson Rotor (May 18, 1913 – September 6, 1998) was a Filipino-American physicist and mathematician whose pioneering work during World War II significantly contributed to the development of the proximity fuse, a crucial advancement in military technology that played a critical role in the Allied victory of World War II.

== Early life and education ==
Emma Unson Rotor was born on May 18, 1913, in Manila, Philippines. She attended the University of Santo Tomas in Manila, where she earned an undergraduate degree in math, and a master’s degree in physics in 1937. After she graduated, she worked as a mathematics instructor at the University of Santo Tomas for several years. In October 1941, she moved to the United States to study physics at Johns Hopkins University. However, the outbreak of World War II disrupted her plans. Unable to access her Philippine government scholarship, she needed to work to support herself. Rotor enrolled in a typing and shorthand course at the YMCA and subsequently worked as a stenographer at the Enoch Pratt Free Library in Baltimore while taking courses at Johns Hopkins University.

== Research and career ==
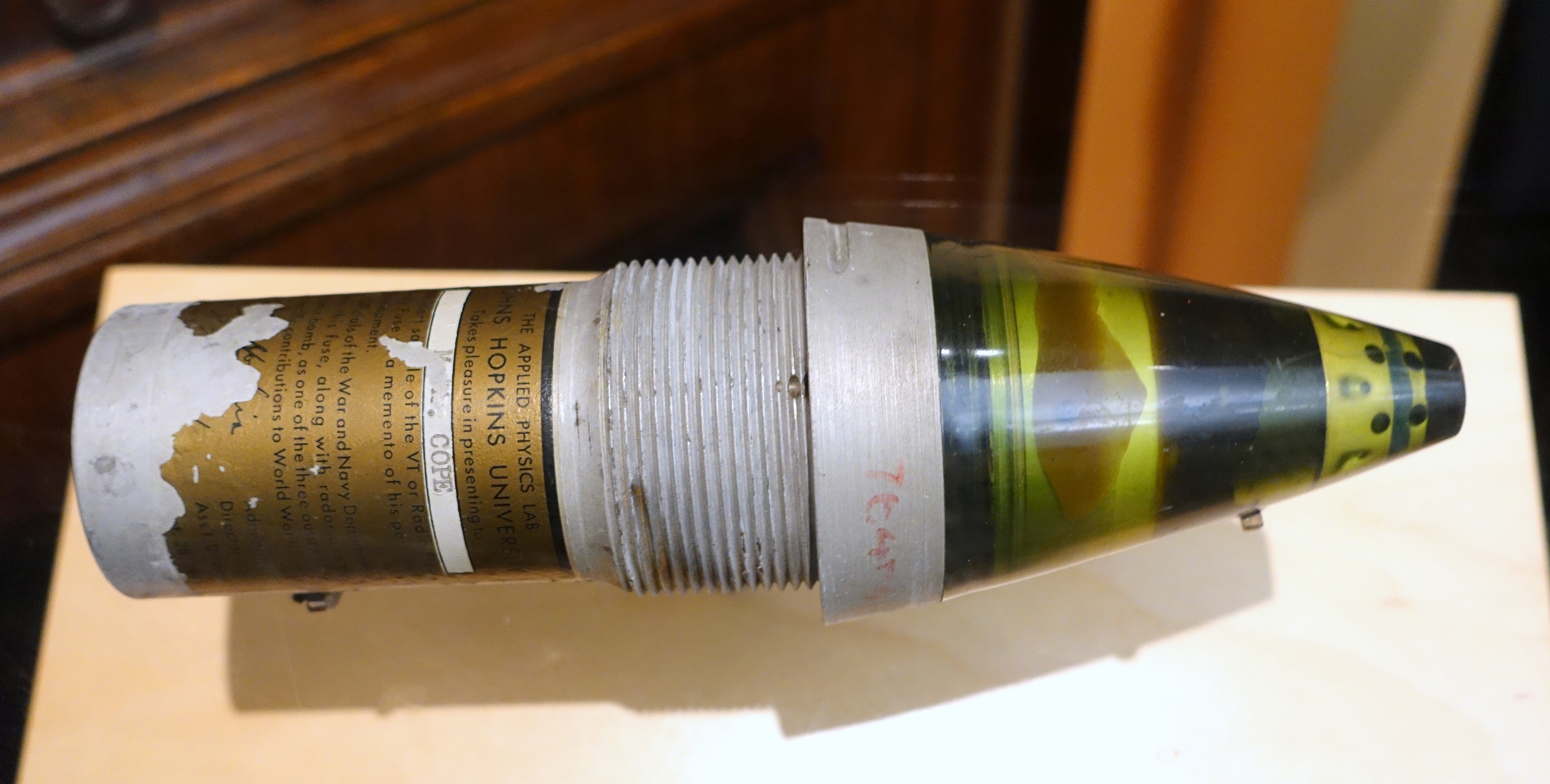
Proximity fuse, Applied Physics Lab, Johns Hopkins University, 1945 - National Museum of American History

In January 1944, Rotor joined the Ordinance Development Division at the National Bureau of Standards (NBS), now known as the National Institute of Standards and Technology (NIST). Hired as a physicist under a wartime appointment, she supported experimental investigations into the development of new ordinance devices, which are military tools or weapons designed for combat. Her work involved the design, construction, and testing of mechanical, electrical, and radio components for these devices. Rotor and her colleagues developed the proximity fuse, a sophisticated device designed to detonate missiles as they approach their targets, rather than upon direct impact. This technology relied on radio waves to detect the proximity of a target and then trigger detonation. It drastically improved the accuracy and effectiveness of anti-aircraft artillery, particularly against enemy aircraft and V-1 flying bombs.

The proximity fuse project was highly classified during its development, and its successful implementation had a profound impact on the war effort. Millions of proximity fuses were produced, with a significant portion of the U.S. electronics industry dedicated to their manufacture. This effort also contributed to advancements in miniaturized electronics, laying the groundwork for future innovations in the electronics industry.

Rotor played a critical role in refining the proximity fuse technology. Her work involved complex calculations and applying her knowledge of physics and mathematics to solve various technical challenges such as limiting the vibration of the devices.

She co-authored and published several scientific articles, including Air Travel for Arming Covers and Measurement of Dynamic Propeller Unbalance, which were cited in a 1946 summary report of the Ordinance Development Division’s work on proximity fuses. Her supervisor, physicist William B. McLean, praised her as an exceptionally valuable member of the project and rated her performance as excellent.

Additionally, Rotor conducted significant research on bomb trajectories. One of her notable contributions, co-authored with Albert G. Hoyem, was "Evaluation of the Toss Technique," which detailed the results of experiments to determine exact bomb trajectories. This work was included in the 1946 publication "Bomb, Rocket, and Torpedo Tossing," a comprehensive collection of scientific articles. Rotor’s meticulous oversight in reviewing and compiling the final publication was highly praised. In a male-dominated field, she was the only woman among the authors.

After World War II and the Japanese occupation of the Philippines ended, Rotor returned to the Philippines where she worked as a teacher and academic dean at Assumption College.

== Personal life ==
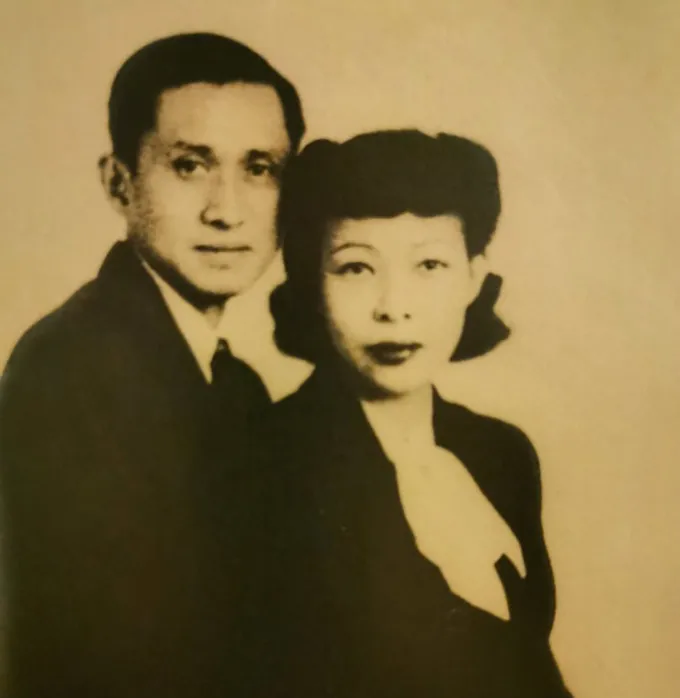
Emma Rotor and Arturo Rotor

Emma Unson Rotor met her husband, Arturo Belleza Rotor, at a party in Manila. After several years of friendship, they decided to marry in 1940. Arturo was a renowned medical doctor, civil servant, musician, and writer, celebrated as one of the best Filipino short story writers of the twentieth century. The couple did not have any children. Emma enjoyed teaching, solving puzzles, and playing tennis and golf.
