= Crigler (surname) =

Crigler is a surname of German origin. It is the Americanized form of the surname Kriegler, a nickname for a person who liked to quarrel. Notable people with the surname include:

- Idona Crigler (1922–1994), American baseball player
- John Crigler (1936–2012), American basketball player
- John Fielding Crigler (1919–2018), American pediatrician
- T. Frank Crigler (1935–2021), American foreign service officer
