= Gunn rat =

Mutant rat

The Gunn rat, discovered by Charles Kenneth Gunn, was a mutant laboratory rat discovered in 1934 at the Connaught Laboratory in Toronto, Canada. These rats were jaundiced and the defect (a lack of the enzyme uridine diphosphate glucuronyltransferase) was transmitted as an autosomal recessive characteristic. Gunn, a geneticist, bred them at Connaught and later moved to Summerside, Prince Edward Island, Canada, to head up the Canadian Experimental Fox Ranch. The animal model has been used to develop experimental treatments for Crigler–Najjar syndrome.
