= Frank B. Johnson (pathologist) =

American pathologist

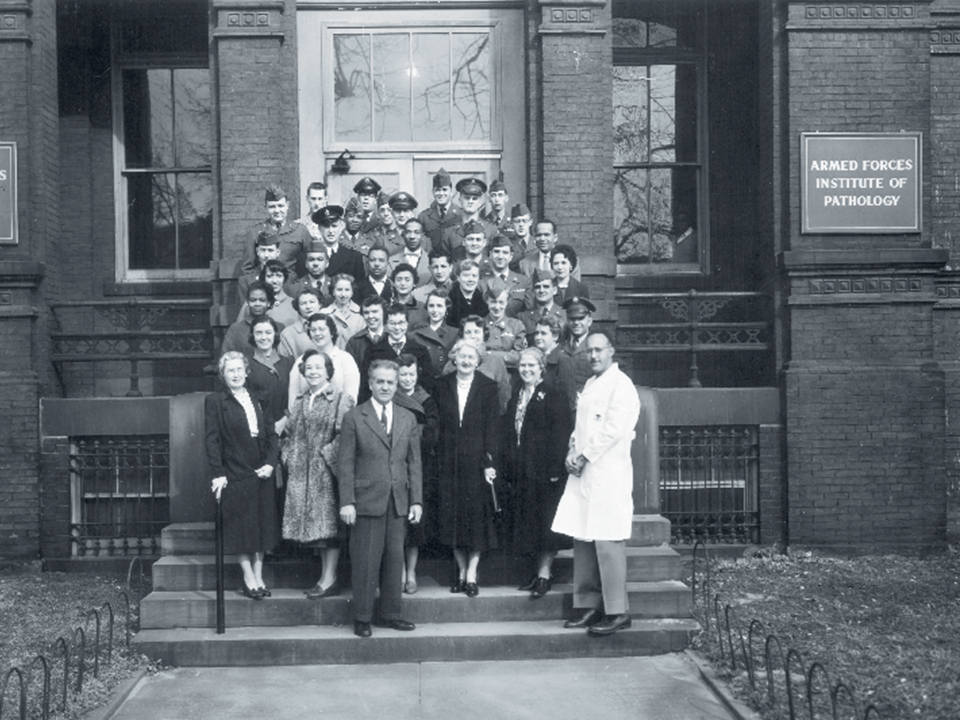
Frank B. Johnson (bottom right) with other staff members of the Histochemistry Branch of the Armed Forces Institute of Pathology in 1954 at the Army Medical Museum building in Washington, DC. (NMHM NCP 17338)

Frank Bacchus Johnson (1919–2005) was an African American chemical pathologist of the 20th century.

Johnson was born on February 1, 1919, in Washington, District of Columbia, United States of America. He graduated from the University of Michigan with a Bachelor's Degree in Chemistry followed by a Doctor of Medicine at Howard University in 1944. He was commissioned as a 1st Lieutenant in the United States Army Medical Corps. When he tried to get an assignment with either an Army or the Navy hospital, he was told that his services were not needed because they "have enough colored physicians" and he was subsequently discharged from service.

Johnson served an internship at Jersey City Medical Center in Jersey City, New Jersey in internal medicine and pathology. He returned to Howard University to serve as the acting Director of Laboratories at Freedman's Hospital from 1946 to 1948. He accepted a post-doctoral fellowship in medical science with the Atomic Energy Commission at the University of Illinois, Chicago.

In 1952, Johnson accepted a commission as a Captain in the United States Army Reserve. He was assigned to the Armed Forces Institute of Pathology (AFIP) for a ten-day temporary duty. During that time, he was able to get a freeze drying apparatus (he had worked with inventor of the device, Isadore Gersh, while at the University of Illinois, Chicago) needed for research projects operational. The ten day temporary duty became his career after General Elbert DeCoursey, AFIP Director, asked him if he wanted to stay.

Johnson was instrumental in acquiring the AFIP's first electron microscopes and ultracentrifuges in the mid-1950s, giving institute pathologists the ability to see further into the interior cellular structure than was possible with optical microscopes. He became the chairman of the Chemical Pathology Department in 1974 and he was promoted into the Senior Executive Service five years later. He served as registrar of the Former Prisoners of War Registry, an initiative of the Veteran's Administration to collect pathology specimens from these veterans to study the effects of their captivity as they aged. In 2001, he was involved in identifying materials in the anthrax spores sent to the U.S. Capital and other locations. He retired in 2004.

Johnson's most significant contribution included the histochemistry identification of a variety of substances in tissue sections. Johnson ran the AFIP Histochemistry Pathology course from 1954 to 1984. This course helped define the field since there were no similar courses were being taught at medical schools.

Johnson collaborated with Isadore Dubin in characterizing a mild form of jaundice currently known as Dubin–Johnson syndrome.
