= Bilirubinuria =

- Bilirubin

In medicine, bilirubinuria is an abnormality in which conjugated bilirubin is detected in the urine.

The term "biliuria" is very similar, but more general. It refers to the presence of any bile pigment in the urine.

Conjugated bilirubin is detected in urine at bilirubinemia of approximately 30-34 mmol/L or 2 mg/dL. In this concentration of conjugated bilirubin in the blood appears as yellowness of the mucous membranes and sclera.

== Causes ==
The most common cause of bilirubinuria is hepatocellular disease. More rare causes include inherited disorders, such as Dubin–Johnson syndrome and Rotor syndrome.

Although Gilbert's syndrome and Crigler–Najjar syndrome are characterized by increased bilirubin in the serum, the bilirubin in these inherited disorders is not conjugated and thus not excreted in the urine.

The increase of stercobilin (urobilin) in the feces and urine is caused by the enhanced intracellular hemolysis of erythrocytes. Formed an unconjugated bilirubin entering the intestine, gives a large number of stercobilinogen (urobilinogen). Last absorbed into the blood and passes into the urine.
