= Victor Assad Najjar =

- Born: فكتور أسعد نجار; April 15, 1914; Beirut
- Died: 30 November 2002 (aged 88); Nashville, Tennessee
- Education: American University in Beirut
- Known for: Crigler–Najjar syndrome

Victor Assad Najjar (1914–2002) was a Lebanese-born American pediatrician and microbiologist at the Johns Hopkins Hospital, Vanderbilt University and Tufts University. Along with John Fielding Crigler, Najjar is known for Crigler–Najjar syndrome.

== Life ==
He was born on 15 April 1914 in Beirut. He studied medicine at the American University in Beirut, graduating in 1935. Three years later he came to the United States and trained in pediatrics at the Johns Hopkins Hospital, then held a faculty appointment at the Johns Hopkins School of Medicine from 1949 to 1957. For the next ten years he was professor and chairman of the department of microbiology at Vanderbilt University School of Medicine in Nashville, Tennessee.

In 1968 he became professor of molecular biology at the Massachusetts Division of the American Cancer Society, and chief of the division of protein chemistry at Tufts University School of Medicine in Boston, Massachusetts. He was American Cancer Society Research Professor of Molecular Biology and Microbiology at Tufts University School of Medicine from 1978 to 1984.

Najjar died on 30 November 2002 in Nashville, Tennessee.
