= UDP glucuronosyltransferase 1 family, polypeptide A1 =

Enzyme found in humans

UGT1A1

Identifiers
- Aliases: UGT1A1, BILIQTL1, GNT1, HUG-BR1, UDPGT, UDPGT 1-1, UGT1, UGT1A, UDP glucuronosyltransferase family 1 member A1
- External IDs: OMIM: 191740; MGI: 98898; GeneCards: UGT1A1
Enzyme activity
EC #	BRENDA	ExPASy	KEGG	MetaCyc
2.4.1.17	↗	↗	↗	↗

Gene location (Human)
Chr.	Chromosome 2 (human)
Band	2q37.1	Start	233,760,270 bp
Band	2q37.1	End	233,773,300 bp

Gene location (Mouse)
Chr.	Chromosome 1 (mouse)
Band	1 D|1 44.55 cM	Start	88,139,681 bp
Band	1 D|1 44.55 cM	End	88,146,719 bp
RNA expression pattern
Bgee	Human / Mouse (ortholog); Top expressed in: duodenum; right lobe of liver; testicle; mucosa of transverse colon; human kidney; rectum; urinary bladder; renal cortex; gallbladder; olfactory zone of nasal mucosa / Top expressed in: duodenum; jejunum; ileum; lip; colon; hepatobiliary system; liver; vasculature of organ; zone of skin; ventricular system; More reference expression data
BioGPS	n/a
Gene ontology
Molecular function	transferase activity; enzyme inhibitor activity; retinoic acid binding; hexosyltransferase activity; protein homodimerization activity; glycosyltransferase activity; steroid binding; protein heterodimerization activity; enzyme binding; glucuronosyltransferase activity; UDP-glycosyltransferase activity
Cellular component	integral component of membrane; endoplasmic reticulum membrane; membrane; intracellular membrane-bounded organelle; integral component of plasma membrane; cytochrome complex; endoplasmic reticulum chaperone complex; endoplasmic reticulum
Biological process	steroid metabolic process; response to organic cyclic compound; cellular response to ethanol; estrogen metabolic process; response to nutrient; negative regulation of steroid metabolic process; bilirubin conjugation; response to steroid hormone; response to glucocorticoid; retinoic acid metabolic process; negative regulation of cellular glucuronidation; response to organic substance; response to lipopolysaccharide; cellular response to hormone stimulus; heme catabolic process; cellular response to glucocorticoid stimulus; acute-phase response; heterocycle metabolic process; animal organ regeneration; response to starvation; flavone metabolic process; liver development; metabolism; negative regulation of glucuronosyltransferase activity; response to ethanol; negative regulation of fatty acid metabolic process; biphenyl catabolic process; cellular response to estradiol stimulus; flavonoid glucuronidation; cellular glucuronidation; xenobiotic glucuronidation; cellular response to xenobiotic stimulus; negative regulation of catalytic activity
Sources:Amigo / QuickGO
Orthologs
Databases	NCBI: entry; OMA: entry
Species	Human	Mouse
Entrez	54658	394436
Ensembl	ENSG00000241635	ENSMUSG00000089960
UniProt	P22309	Q63886
RefSeq (mRNA)	NM_000463	NM_201645
RefSeq (protein)	NP_000454	NP_964007
Location (UCSC)	Chr 2: 233.76 – 233.77 Mb	Chr 1: 88.14 – 88.15 Mb
PubMed search
- Wikidata
View/Edit Human	View/Edit Mouse

UDP-glucuronosyltransferase 1-1, also known as UGT-1A, is an enzyme that in humans is encoded by the UGT1A1 gene.

UGT-1A is a uridine diphosphate glucuronosyltransferase (UDP-glucuronosyltransferase, UDPGT or UGT), an enzyme of the glucuronidation pathway that transforms small lipophilic (fat-soluble) molecules, such as steroids, bilirubin, hormones, and drugs, into water-soluble, excretable metabolites.

== Gene ==
The UGT1A1 gene is part of a complex locus that encodes several UDP-glucuronosyltransferases. The locus includes thirteen unique alternative first exons followed by four common exons. Four of the alternate first exons are considered pseudogenes. Each of the remaining nine 5' exons may be spliced to the four common exons, resulting in nine proteins with different N-termini and identical C-termini. Each first exon encodes the substrate binding site, and is regulated by its own promoter. Over 100 genetic variants within the UGT1A1 gene have been described, some of which confer increased, reduced or inactive enzymatic activity. The UGT nomenclature committee has compiled a list of these variants, naming each with a * symbol followed by a number.

== Clinical significance ==
Mutations in this gene cause serious problems for bilirubin metabolism; each syndrome can be caused by one or many mutations, so they are differentiated mostly by symptoms and not particular mutations:

- Gilbert syndrome (GS) can be caused by a variety of genetic changes, but in populations of European and African descent, it is most commonly associated with the UGT1A1*28 allele (rs8175347), a homozygous 2-bp insertion (T A) mutation of the TATA box promoter region of the UGT1A1 gene. This polymorphism impairs proper transcription of UGT1A1 gene, resulting in decreased transcriptional activity of UGT1A1 by about 70%; the resulting reduced enzyme activity leads to the hyperbilirubinemia characteristic of GS. The *28 polymorphism occurs with a frequency of 26-31% in White and 42-56% of African-Americans. About 10-15% of these populations are homozygous for the *28 allele, but only 5% actually develop UGT1A1-associated hyperbilirubinemia, so it appears that this mutation alone may be a necessary but not sufficient factor in GS, perhaps acting in combination with other UGT1A1 mutation(s) to increase the chances of developing GS. In Asian and Pacific Islander populations, UGT1A1*28 is much less common, occurring at a frequency of approximately 9-16% in Asian populations and 4% of Pacific Islanders. In these populations, Gilbert's syndrome is more often due to missense mutations in the coding region of the gene, such as UGT1A1*6 (glycine to arginine substitution at position 71 (G71R); rs4148323) A special phenobarbital-responsive enhancer module NR3 region (gtPBREM NR3) helps to increase UDPGT enzyme production, which would make it conceptually possible to medically control the bilirubin level, although this is rarely necessary, particularly in adults (usually the level of total serum bilirubin in Gilbert syndrome patients vary from 1 to 6 mg/dL).
- Crigler–Najjar syndrome, type I is associated with mutation(s) that result in a complete absence of normal UGT1A1 enzyme, which causes a severe hyperbilirubinemia with levels of total serum bilirubin from 20 to 45 mg/dL. Phenobarbital treatment does not help to lower bilirubin level, because it only increases the amount of mutated UGT1A1 enzyme, which is still unable to catalyze the glucuronidation of bilirubin, which on the other hand makes phenobarbital treatment diagnostically relevant.
- Crigler–Najjar syndrome, type II is associated with other mutation(s) that lead to a reduced activity of the mutated UGT1A1 enzyme, which causes a hyperbilirubinemia with levels of total serum bilirubin from 6 to 20 mg/dL. In this case phenobarbital treatment helps to lower bilirubin lever by more than 30%.
- Hyperbilirubinemia, familial transient neonatal (also called breastfeeding jaundice) is associated with mutation(s) that alone do not lead to bilirubin level increase in female patients, but their children when breastfed develop from mild to severe hyperbilirubinemia by receiving steroidal substances (with milk) inhibiting glucuronidation of unconjugated bilirubin that may lead to jaundice and even kernicterus.

== Pharmacogenetics ==
Genetic variations within the UGT1A1 gene have also been associated with the development of certain drug toxicities. The UGT1A1*28 variant, the same allele behind many cases of Gilbert syndrome. The UGT1A1*28 has been associated with an increased risk for neutropenia and Diarrhea in patients receiving the chemotherapeutic drug irinotecan due to the insufficient excrete the active metabolite SN‐38, which primarily undergoes glucuronidation in livers. The U.S. Food and Drug Administration recommends on the irinotecan drug label that patients with the *28/*28 genotype receive a lower starting dose of the drug. The *28 allele has also shown associations with an increased risk for developing diarrhea in patients receiving irinotecan. The UGT1A1*6 variant, more common in Asian populations than the *28 variant, has also shown associations with the development of irinotecan toxicities. Patients who are heterozygous or homozygous for the *6 allele may have a higher risk for developing neutropenia and diarrhea as compared to those with the UGT1A1*1/*1 genotype.

== See also ==
- Glucuronosyltransferase
- Lucey-Driscoll syndrome
- Neonatal jaundice
- Cancer pharmacogenomics
