= Biliverdin reductase B =

Protein-coding gene in the species Homo sapiens

BLVRB

Identifiers
- Aliases: BLVRB, BVRB, FLR, HEL-S-10, SDR43U1, Biliverdin reductase B
- External IDs: OMIM: 600941; MGI: 2385271; GeneCards: BLVRB
Available structures
| PDB | Ortholog search: PDBe RCSB |
| PDB | List of PDB id codes 1HDO, 1HE2, 1HE3, 1HE4, 1HE5 |
Enzyme activity
| EC # | BRENDA | ExPASy | KEGG | MetaCyc |
|---|---|---|---|---|
| 1.3.1.24 | ↗ | ↗ | ↗ | ↗ |
| 1.5.1.30 | ↗ | ↗ | ↗ | ↗ |

Gene location (Human)
| Chr. | Chromosome 19 (human) |
| Band | 19q13.2 | Start | 40,447,765 bp |
| Band | 19q13.2 | End | 40,465,764 bp |

Gene location (Mouse)
| Chr. | Chromosome 7 (mouse) |
| Band | 7|7 A3 | Start | 27,147,403 bp |
| Band | 7|7 A3 | End | 27,165,569 bp |
RNA expression pattern
| Bgee | Human / Mouse (ortholog); Top expressed in: trabecular bone; monocyte; right lobe of liver; muscle of thigh; body of stomach; apex of heart; bone marrow; spleen; gastrocnemius muscle; blood / Top expressed in: fetal liver hematopoietic progenitor cell; tibiofemoral joint; left lobe of liver; stroma of bone marrow; olfactory epithelium; spleen; human fetus; lumbar spinal ganglion; blood; gastric mucosa; More reference expression data |
| BioGPS | n/a |
Gene ontology
| Molecular function | oxidoreductase activity; biliverdin reductase (NAD(P)+) activity; riboflavin reductase (NADPH) activity |
| Cellular component | cytosol; plasma membrane; extracellular exosome; nucleoplasm; cytoplasm; terminal bouton |
| Biological process | heme catabolic process |
Sources:Amigo / QuickGO
Orthologs
| Databases | NCBI: entry; OMA: entry |
| Species | Human | Mouse |
| Entrez | 645 | 233016 |
| Ensembl | ENSG00000090013 | ENSMUSG00000040466 |
| UniProt | P30043 | Q923D2 |
| RefSeq (mRNA) | NM_000713 | NM_001290525; NM_144923 |
| RefSeq (protein) | NP_000704 | NP_001277454; NP_659172 |
| Location (UCSC) | Chr 19: 40.45 – 40.47 Mb | Chr 7: 27.15 – 27.17 Mb |
| PubMed search |
- Wikidata
| View/Edit Human | View/Edit Mouse |

Biliverdin reductase B is a protein that in humans is encoded by the BLVRB gene.

== Structure ==
The BLVRB gene was localized to chromosome 19, the specific region being 19q13.13 to q13.2; this was done using fluorescence in situ hybridization.

BLVRB encodes a protein that is a 206-residue monomeric enzyme. The structure of BVR-B has a single-domain architecture consisting of a central parallel beta-sheet with alpha-helices on either side. This characteristic dinucleotide binding fold comprises, in this case, a seven-stranded parallel beta-sheet further extended by an antiparallel strand. In addition to the seven long strands of the main pleated sheet, a short parallel beta-sheet (strands 6a and 6c) is formed within the loop joining strand 6 and alpha-helix F. The central beta-sheet and the two groups of helices are held together mainly through hydrophobic interactions. One group of helices is made up of alpha-helices C, D, and E. The second group is composed of alpha-helices A and F and includes a short 310-helix between strands beta2 and beta3, in contrast to typical dinucleotide binding proteins in which a regular alpha-helix flanks these beta-strands. The most flexible loop in the structure corresponds to loop 120, between strand 5 and alpha-helix E, which contains residues with the highest main chain B-factors, with the exception of the N-terminal region.

== Function ==
The final step in heme metabolism in mammals is catalyzed by the cytosolic biliverdin reductase enzymes A and B (EC 1.3.1.24). From a functional standpoint, it has been hypothesized that BLRVB is identical to flavin reductase (FR), an enzyme that catalyzes the NADPH-dependent reduction of FMN and Methylene Blue and, in the presence of redox couplers, the reduction of methaemoglobin.

There have been two isoforms of BLVRB, I and II, that have been isolated and characterized. The purified enzymes were monomers with a molecular weight of about 21,000, and they used NADPH and NADH as electron donors for the reduction of biliverdin. The identified Km values of isozymes I and II for NADPH are 35.9 and 13.1 μM, respectively, whereas those for NADH are 5.6 and 8.2, indicating that NADPH rather than NADH acts as the physiological electron donor in reaction. The NADPH-dependent enzyme activities are inhibited by substrate concentrations in excess of 3-4 μM. The optimum pH of the reaction with NADPH for isozymes I and II is 8.2. Flavin reductase/biliverdin-IXbeta reductase has also been shown to exhibit ferric reductase activity, with an apparent K(m) of 2.5 μM for the ferric iron. The ferric reductase reaction requires NAD(P)H and FMN. This activity is intriguing, as haem cleavage in the foetus produces non-alpha isomers of biliverdin and ferric iron, both of which are substrates for flavin reductase/biliverdin-IXbeta reductase.

== Clinical significance ==
As BLVRB is a promiscuous enzyme catalysing the pyridine-nucleotide-dependent reduction of a variety of flavins, biliverdins, PQQ (pyrroloquinoline quinone), and ferric ion. Mechanistically it is a good model for BVR-A (biliverdin-IXalpha reductase), a potential pharmacological target for neonatal jaundice, and also a potential target for adjunct therapy to maintain protective levels of biliverdin-IXalpha during organ transplantation.

== Interactions ==
BLVRB binds to human heme oxygenase-1 (hHO-1) in conjunction with cytochrome p450 reductase to catalyzes the NADPH-cytochrome P450 reductase-dependent oxidation of heme to biliverdin, CO, and free iron.
