= Lucey–Driscoll syndrome =

- Other names: Transient familial neonatal hyperbilirubinemia
- Lucey–Driscoll syndrome has an autosomal recessive pattern of inheritance.
- Specialty: DiseasesDB = 32677

Lucey–Driscoll syndrome is an autosomal recessive metabolic disorder affecting enzymes involved in bilirubin metabolism. It is one of several disorders classified as a transient familial neonatal unconjugated hyperbilirubinemia.

== Cause ==
The common cause is congenital, but it can also be caused by maternal steroids passed on through breast milk to the newborn. It is different from breast feeding-associated jaundice (breast-fed infants have higher bilirubin levels than formula-fed ones).

A defect in the UGT1A1-gene, also linked to Crigler–Najjar syndrome and Gilbert's syndrome, is responsible for the congenital form of Lucey–Driscoll syndrome.

== Treatment ==
Treatment is as per neonatal jaundice, and includes phototherapy and exchange transfusions. If left untreated, Lucey-Driscoll syndrome may lead to seizures, kernicterus, and even death.

Once treated, most patients will have no additional complications.
