= Dubin–Johnson syndrome =

Genetic liver disease

- Other names: Conjugated Hyperbilirubinemia
- Bilirubin
- Specialty: Pediatrics, hepatology
- Symptoms: Jaundice, otherwise asymptomatic
- Prognosis: Good

Dubin–Johnson syndrome is a rare, autosomal recessive, benign disorder that causes an isolated increase of conjugated bilirubin in the serum. Classically, the condition causes a black liver due to the deposition of a pigment similar to melanin. This condition is associated with a defect in the ability of hepatocytes to secrete conjugated bilirubin into the bile, and is similar to Rotor syndrome. It is usually asymptomatic, but may be diagnosed in early infancy based on laboratory tests. No treatment is usually needed.

== Signs and symptoms ==
In the majority of patients with this syndrome, they lack overt signs and are incidentally diagnosed during routine laboratory tests with isolated conjugated hyperbilirubinemia despite normal liver enzymes and otherwise normal liver function. When symptoms do appear, they may be generalized weakness, nonspecific stomach pain, yellowing of the skin and eyes (jaundice), and darkening of the urine. Around 80 to 99% of people with Dubin–Johnson syndrome have jaundice, abnormal urinary color, biliary tract abnormality, and conjugated bilirubinemia. The intensity of jaundice may also vary from time to time, usually increasing with illnesses. Around 30 to 79% of people with the disorder have abnormality of the gastric mucosa. Other rare symptoms include fever and fatigue. In some cases, mild liver enlargement can be detected .

The disease may occur at any age, sometimes as late as the sixth decade of life and has been described to occur during pregnancy or on the administration of hormonal contraceptives. Extremely rare is the neonatal presentation, but this does consist of marked jaundice and hepatosplenomegaly. In most presentations outside of the neonatal range, Dubin-Johnson syndrome does not require treatment. However, few patients develop disease such as cholecystitis, which could be due to the formation of fine bilirubin pigment stones.

== Pathophysiology ==
The conjugated hyperbilirubinemia is a result of defective endogenous and exogenous transfer of anionic conjugates from hepatocytes into bile. Impaired biliary excretion of bilirubin glucuronides is due to a mutation in the canalicular multiple drug-resistance protein 2 (MRP2). A darkly pigmented liver is due to polymerized epinephrine metabolites, not bilirubin.

Dubin–Johnson syndrome has an autosomal recessive pattern of inheritance.

Dubin–Johnson syndrome is due to a defect in the multiple drug resistance protein 2 gene (ABCC2), located on chromosome 10. It is an autosomal recessive disease and is likely due to a loss of function mutation, since the mutation affects the cytoplasmic/binding domain.

== Histology ==
In Dubin–Johnson syndrome, liver histology reveals a prominent buildup of a dark, coarse, granular pigment within hepatocytes called lipomelanin. This pigment, often referred to as lipofuscin-like or melanin-like, accumulates predominantly in the centrilobular (perivenular) regions but can be seen throughout the hepatic lobule. The deposits are especially noticeable in older individuals and may cause the liver tissue to appear dark brown to black on gross examination. This discoloration can be striking on liver biopsy cores and may serve as a key diagnostic clue. Despite its resemblance to melanin, spectroscopic analysis has shown that the pigment is actually a stable free radical compound with atypical characteristics, rather than true melanin.

== Diagnosis ==
A hallmark of Dubin–Johnson syndrome is the unusual ratio between the byproducts of heme biosynthesis:

- Unaffected subjects have a coproporphyrin III to coproporphyrin I ratio around 3–4:1.
- In patients with Dubin–Johnson syndrome, this ratio is inverted, with coproporphyrin I being 3–4 times higher than coproporphyrin III. Analysis of urine porphyrins shows a normal level of coproporphyrin, but the I isomer accounts for 80% of the total (normally 25%).

For the first two days of life, healthy neonates have ratios of urinary coproporphyrin similar to those seen in patients with Dubin–Johnson syndrome; by 10 days of life, however, these levels convert to the normal adult ratio.

In post mortem autopsy, the liver will have a dark pink or black appearance due to pigment accumulation.

Plentiful canalicular multiple drug-resistant protein causes bilirubin transfer to bile canaliculi. An isoform of this protein is localized to the apical hepatocyte membrane, allowing transport of glucuronide and glutathione conjugates back into the blood. High levels of gamma-glutamyl transferase (GGT) help in diagnosing pathologies involving biliary obstruction.

=== Differentiation from Rotor syndrome ===
Dubin–Johnson syndrome is similar to Rotor syndrome, but can be differentiated by:

	Rotor syndrome	Dubin–Johnson syndrome
Appearance of liver	normal histology and appearance	liver has black pigmentation
Gallbladder visualization	gallbladder can be visualized by oral cholecystogram	gallbladder cannot be visualized
Total urine coproporphyrin content	high with <70% being isomer 1	normal with >80% being isomer 1 (normal urine contains more of isomer 3 than isomer 1)

A test of MRP2 activity can also be done to differentiate between Dubin–Johnson syndrome and Rotor syndrome. The clearance of bromsulphthalein is used to determine this, the test for which is called bromsulphthalein clearance test. 100 units of BSP is injected intravenously and then the clearance. In case of Dubin–Johnson syndrome, clearance of bromsulphthalein will be within 90 minutes, while in case of Rotor syndrome, the clearance is slow, i.e., it takes more than 90 minutes for clearance.

== Treatment ==
Dubin–Johnson syndrome is a benign condition and no treatment is required. However, it is important to recognize the condition so as not to confuse it with other hepatobiliary disorders associated with conjugated hyperbilirubinemia that require treatment or have a different prognosis.

== Prognosis ==
Prognosis is good, and treatment of this syndrome is usually unnecessary. Most patients are asymptomatic and have normal lifespans. Some neonates present with cholestasis. Hormonal contraceptives and pregnancy may lead to overt jaundice and icterus (yellowing of the eyes and skin).

== History ==
Pathologists Frank Johnson and Isadore Dubin first described Dubin–Johnson syndrome in 1954.

== See also ==
- Jaundice
- Gilbert's syndrome
- Crigler–Najjar syndrome
