= John Fielding Crigler =

American pediatrician (1919–2018)

- Born: September 11, 1919
- Died: 13 May 2018 (aged 98)
- Known for: Crigler–Najjar syndrome

John Fielding Crigler (11 September 1919 - 13 May 2018) was an American pediatrician. Along with Victor Assad Najjar, Crigler is known for Crigler–Najjar syndrome. He studied medicine at the Duke University School of Medicine, graduating in 1943. He trained in pediatrics at Boston Children's Hospital.
