= Acholia =

Pale feces due to impaired bile secretion in the bowel

- Other names: Hypocholia
- A comparison of acholic stool color to that of other stool types
- Specialty: Gastroenterology

Acholia is pale feces, due to lack of bile which results in the normal brown colour. It is a sign of reduced conjugated bilirubin into the bowel, as a result of a problem in the liver itself or in the biliary tree.

== Signs and symptoms ==
Acholia results in pale feces.

== Cause ==
A condition in which little or no bile is secreted or the flow of bile into the digestive tract is obstructed. The acholia is a sign of many diseases, such as hepatitis.

== Etymology ==
Ancient Greek: a + chole (without bile).

== See also ==
- Choluria
