= Biliverdin reductase =

Class of enzymes

biliverdin reductase
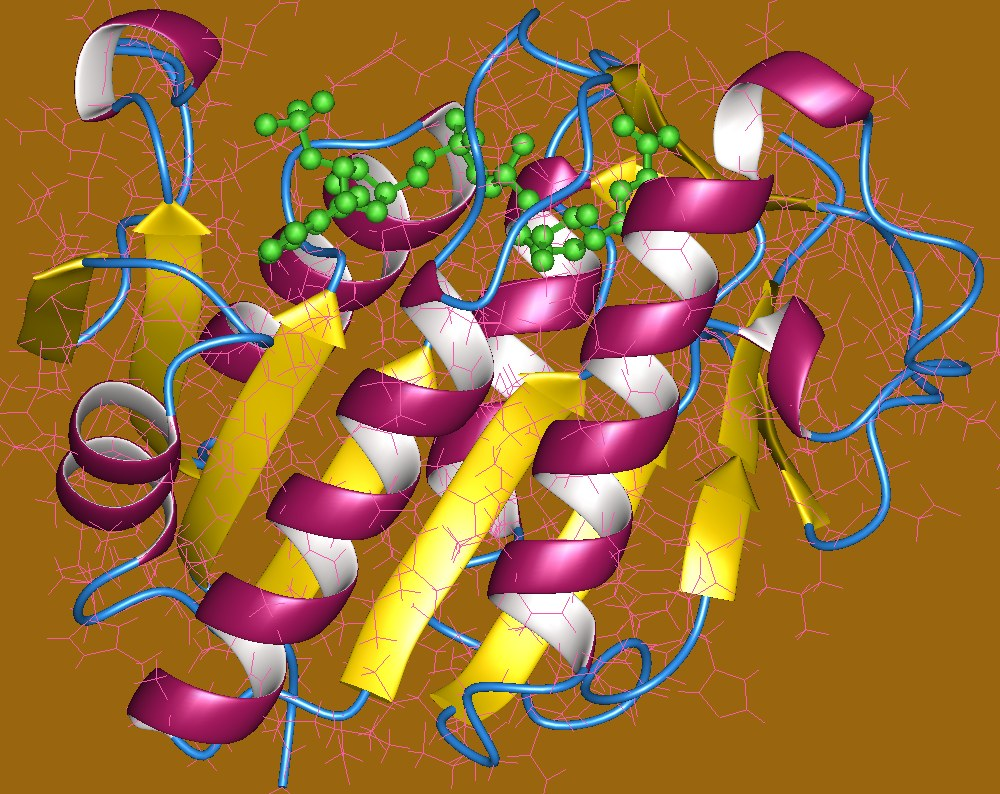

Identifiers
- EC no.: 1.3.1.24
- CAS no.: 9074-10-6

Databases
- BRENDA: enzyme data
- ExPASy: NiceZyme view
- KEGG: enzyme entry
- MetaCyc: metabolic pathway
- Rhea: reactions
- PDB structures: RCSB PDB PDBe PDBsum
- Gene Ontology: AmiGO / QuickGO
Search
- PMC: articles
- PubMed: articles
- NCBI: proteins

biliverdin reductase A
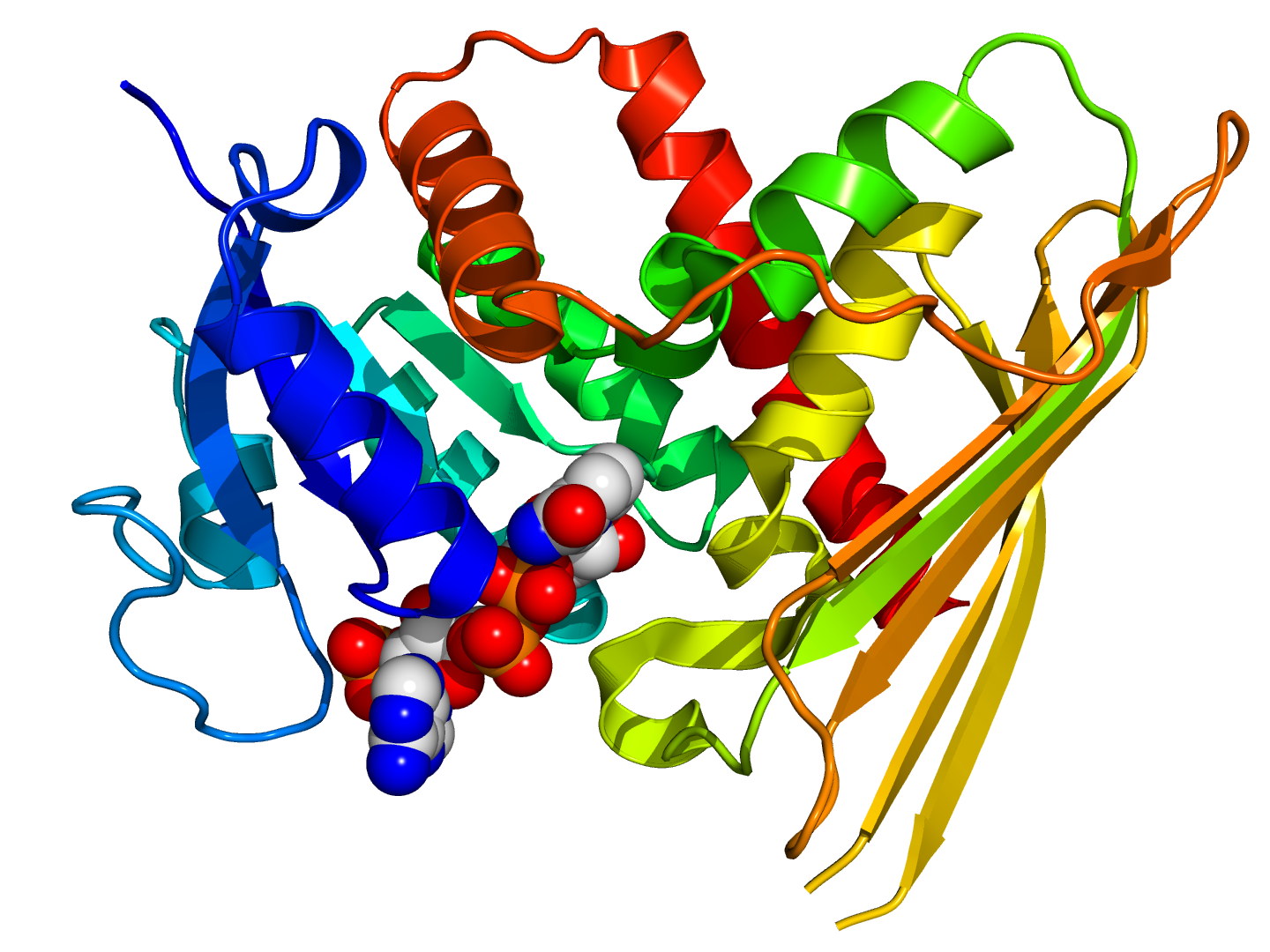
- Crystallographic structure of human biliverdin reductase A based on the PDB: 2H63 coordinates. The enzyme is displayed as a rainbow colored cartoon (N-terminus = blue, C-terminus = red) while the NADP cofactor is displayed as space-filling model (carbon = white, oxygen = red, nitrogen = blue, phosphorus = orange).

Identifiers
- Symbol: BLVRA
- Alt. symbols: BLVR
- NCBI gene: 644
- HGNC: 1062
- OMIM: 109750
- RefSeq: NM_000712
- UniProt: P53004

Other data
- EC number: 1.3.1.24
- Locus: Chr. 7 p14-cen
Search for
- Structures: Swiss-model
- Domains: InterPro

biliverdin reductase B

Identifiers
- Symbol: BLVRB
- Alt. symbols: FLR
- NCBI gene: 645
- HGNC: 1063
- OMIM: 600941
- RefSeq: NM_000713
- UniProt: P30043

Other data
- EC number: 1.3.1.24
- Locus: Chr. 19 q13.1-13.2
Search for
- Structures: Swiss-model
- Domains: InterPro

Biliverdin reductase, catalytic
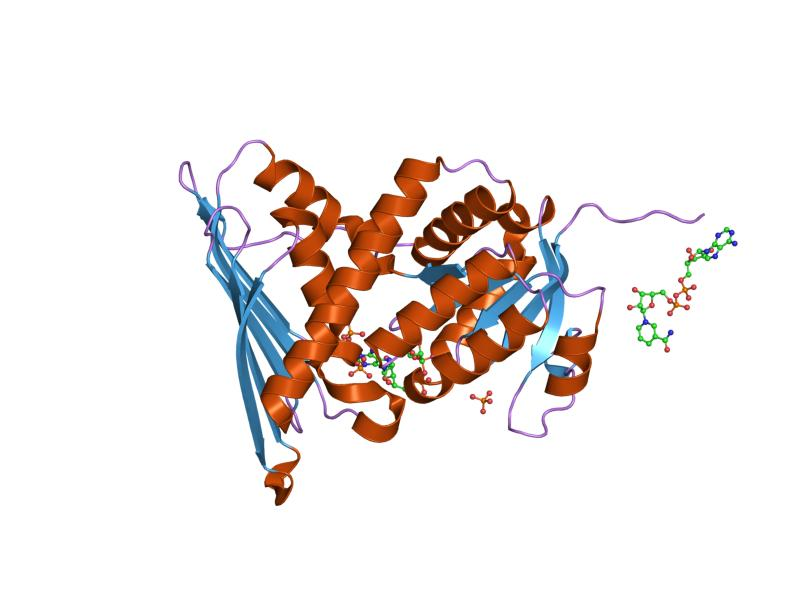
- crystal structure of a biliverdin reductase enzyme-cofactor complex

Identifiers
- Symbol: Biliv-reduc_cat
- Pfam: PF09166
- InterPro: IPR015249
- SCOP2: 1lc0 / SCOPe / SUPFAM
Available protein structures:
- PDB: IPR015249 PF09166 (ECOD; PDBsum)
- AlphaFold: IPR015249; PF09166

Biliverdin reductase (BVR) is an enzyme (EC 1.3.1.24) found in all tissues under normal conditions, but especially in reticulo-macrophages of the liver and spleen. BVR facilitates the conversion of biliverdin to bilirubin via the reduction of a double bond between the second and third pyrrole ring into a single bond.

There are two isozymes in humans, each encoded by its own gene, biliverdin reductase A (BLVRA) and biliverdin reductase B (BLVRB).

== Mechanism of catalysis ==
BVR acts on biliverdin by reducing the double-bond between the pyrrole rings into a single-bond. It accomplishes this using reduced nicotinamide adenine dinucleotide phosphate (NADPH) as its cofactor, forming bilirubin and NADP^{+} as products.

biliverdin
+ NADPH
H^{+}
H^{+}
bilirubin
+ NADP^{+}

BVR catalyzes this reaction through an overlapping binding site including Lys^{18}, Lys^{22}, Lys^{179}, Arg^{183}, and Arg^{185} as key residues. This binding site attaches to biliverdin, and causes its dissociation from heme oxygenase (HO) (which catalyzes reaction of ferric heme → biliverdin), causing the subsequent reduction to bilirubin.

== Structure ==
BVR is composed of two closely packed domains, between 247 and 415 amino acids long and containing a Rossmann fold. BVR has also been determined to be a zinc-binding protein with each enzyme protein having one strong-binding zinc atom.

The C-terminal half of BVR contains the catalytic domain, which adopts a structure containing a six-stranded beta-sheet that is flanked on one face by several alpha-helices. This domain contains the catalytic active site, which reduces the gamma-methene bridge of the open tetrapyrrole, biliverdin IX alpha, to bilirubin with the concomitant oxidation of a NADH or NADPH cofactor.

== Function ==
BVR works with the biliverdin/bilirubin redox cycle. It converts biliverdin to bilirubin (a strong antioxidant), which is then converted back into biliverdin through the actions of reactive oxygen species (ROS). This cycle allows for the neutralization of ROS, and the reuse of biliverdin products. Biliverdin also is replenished in the cycle with its formation from heme units through heme oxygenase (HO) localized from the endoplasmic reticulum.

Bilirubin, being one of the last products of heme degradation in the liver, is further processed and excreted in bile after conjugation with glucuronic acid. In this way, BVR is essential in many mammals for the disposal of heme catabolites – especially in the fetus where the placental membranes are bilirubin-permeable but not biliverdin-permeable – aiding in the removal of potentially toxic protein build-up.

BVR has also more recently been recognized as a regulator of glucose metabolism and in cell growth and apoptosis control, due to its dual-specificity kinase character. This control over glucose metabolism indicates that BVR may play a role in pathogenesis of multiple metabolic diseases – notably diabetes – by control of the upstream activator of insulin growth factor-1 (IGF-1) and mitogen-activated protein kinase (MAPK) signaling pathway.

== Disease relevance ==
BVR acts as a means to regenerate bilirubin in a repeating redox cycle without significantly modifying the concentration of available bilirubin. With these levels maintained, it appears that BVR represents a new strategy for the treatment of multiple sclerosis and other types of oxidative stress-mediated diseases. The mechanism is due to the amplification of the potent antioxidant actions of bilirubin, as this can ameliorate free radical-mediated diseases.

Studies have shown that the BVR redox cycle is essential in providing physiological cytoprotection. Genetic knock-outs and reduced BVR levels have demonstrated increased formation of ROS, and results in augmented cell death. Cells that experienced a 90% reduction in BVR experienced three times normal ROS levels. Through this protective and amplifying cycle, BVR allows low concentrations of bilirubin to overcome 10,000-fold higher concentrations of ROS.
