= Gilbert's syndrome =

Medical condition

- Other names: Gilbert syndrome, Meulengracht syndrome, Gilbert-Lereboullet syndrome, hyperbilirubinemia Arias type, hyperbilirubinemia type 1, familial cholemia, familial nonhemolytic jaundice
- Bilirubin
- Pronunciation: /ʒiːlˈbɛərz/ zheel-BAIRZ
- Specialty: Gastroenterology
- Symptoms: None, abdominal pain, nausea, fatigue, slight jaundice
- Complications: Usually none
- Causes: Genetic
- Differential diagnosis: Crigler–Najjar syndrome, Rotor syndrome, Dubin–Johnson syndrome
- Treatment: None typically needed
- Frequency: ~5%

Gilbert's syndrome (GS) is a syndrome in which the liver of affected individuals processes bilirubin more slowly than the majority, resulting in higher levels in the blood. Many people never have symptoms. Occasionally jaundice (a yellowing of the skin or whites of the eyes) may occur.

Gilbert syndrome is due to a genetic variant in the UGT1A1 gene, which results in decreased activity of the bilirubin uridine diphosphate glucuronosyltransferase (UGT1A1) enzyme. It is typically inherited in an autosomal recessive pattern and occasionally in an autosomal dominant pattern depending on the type of variant. Episodes of jaundice may be triggered by stress such as exercise, menstruation, or not eating. Diagnosis is based on elevated levels of unconjugated bilirubin in the blood without signs of liver problems or red blood cell breakdown.

Typically, no treatment is needed. Phenobarbital aids in the conjugation of bilirubin and can be prescribed if jaundice becomes significant. Gilbert syndrome is associated with decreased cardiovascular health risks but increased risks of some cancers and gallstones. Gilbert syndrome affects about 5% of people in the United States. Males are more often diagnosed than females. It is often not noticed until late childhood to early adulthood. The condition was first described in 1901 by Augustin Nicolas Gilbert.

== Signs and symptoms ==
=== Jaundice ===
Gilbert syndrome produces an elevated level of unconjugated bilirubin in the bloodstream, but normally has no consequences. Mild jaundice may appear under conditions of exertion, stress, fasting, and infections, but the condition is otherwise usually asymptomatic. Severe cases are seen by yellowing of the skin tone and yellowing of the conjunctiva in the eye.

Gilbert syndrome has been reported to contribute to an accelerated onset of neonatal jaundice. The syndrome cannot cause severe indirect hyperbilirubinemia in neonates by itself, but it may have a summative effect on rising bilirubin when combined with other factors, for example in the presence of increased red blood cell destruction due to diseases such as G6PD deficiency. This situation can be especially dangerous if not quickly treated, as the high serum bilirubin can cause irreversible neurological disability in the form of kernicterus.

=== Effects on drug metabolism and drug interactions ===
The enzymes that are defective in GS – UDP glucuronosyltransferase 1 family, polypeptide A1 (UGT1A1) – are also responsible for some of the liver's ability to detoxify certain drugs. For example, Gilbert syndrome is associated with severe diarrhea and neutropenia in patients who are treated with irinotecan, which is metabolized by UGT1A1.

While paracetamol (acetaminophen) is not metabolized by UGT1A1, it is metabolized by one of the other enzymes also deficient in some people with GS. A subset of people with GS may have an increased risk of paracetamol toxicity.

Another drug that has increased adverse side-effects in individuals with Gilbert syndrome is atazanavir. Atazanavir is a protease inhibitor for the treatment of HIV. Atazanavir can lead to jaundice in individuals with Gilbert syndrome because it further inhibits the UGT enzymes that already exhibit decreased activity in Gilbert syndrome.

=== Cardiovascular effects ===
The mild increase in unconjugated bilirubin due to Gilbert syndrome is closely related to the reduction in the prevalence of chronic diseases, especially cardiovascular disease and type 2 diabetes, related risk factors, and all-cause mortality. Observational studies emphasize that the antioxidant effects of unconjugated bilirubin may bring survival benefits to patients.

Several analyses have found a significantly decreased risk of coronary artery disease (CAD) in individuals with GS.

Specifically, people with mildly elevated levels of bilirubin (1.1 mg/dl to 2.7 mg/dl) were at lower risk for CAD and at lower risk for future heart disease. These researchers went on to perform a meta-analysis of data available up to 2002, and confirmed the incidence of atherosclerotic disease (hardening of the arteries) in subjects with GS had a close and inverse relationship to the serum bilirubin. This beneficial effect was attributed to bilirubin IXα which is recognized as a potent antioxidant, rather than confounding factors such as high-density lipoprotein levels.

This association was also seen in long-term data from the Framingham Heart Study. Moderately elevated levels of bilirubin in people with GS and the (TA)_{7}/(TA)_{7} genotype were associated with one-third the risk for both coronary heart disease and cardiovascular disease as compared to those with the (TA)_{6}/(TA)_{6} genotype (i.e. a normal, nonmutated gene locus).

Platelet counts and mean platelet volume (MPV) are decreased in patients with Gilbert's syndrome. The elevated levels of bilirubin and decreasing levels of MPV and CRP in Gilbert's syndrome patients may have an effect on the slowing down of the atherosclerotic process.

=== Other symptoms and links to disease ===
Symptoms, whether connected or not to GS, have been reported in a subset of those affected: fatigue (feeling tired all the time), difficulty maintaining concentration, unusual patterns of anxiety, loss of appetite, nausea, abdominal pain, weight loss, itching (with no rash), and others, such as humor change or depression. But scientific studies found no clear pattern of adverse symptoms related to the elevated levels of unconjugated bilirubin in adults. However, other substances glucuronidated by the affected enzymes in those with Gilbert's syndrome could theoretically, at their toxic levels, cause these symptoms. Consequently, debate exists about whether GS should be classified as a disease.

Gilbert syndrome has been linked to an increased risk of gallstones, schizophrenia, breast cancer, and colorectal cancer. The theorized mechanism for the increased risk of breast cancer is elevated estrogen from its decreased metabolism by UDP-glucuronosyltransferase (UGT) in those with Gilbert syndrome. The cause for the increased risk of schizophrenia is not yet fully understood and is the object of further research.

== Cause ==
Mutations in the UGT1A1 gene lead to Gilbert syndrome. The gene provides instructions for making the bilirubin uridine diphosphate glucuronosyltransferase (bilirubin-UGT) enzyme, which can be found in the liver cells and is responsible for preparing bilirubin for removal from the body.

The bilirubin-UGT enzyme performs a chemical reaction called glucuronidation. Glucuronic acid is transferred to unconjugated bilirubin, which is a yellowish pigment made when your body breaks down old red blood cells, and then being converted to conjugated bilirubin during the reaction. Conjugated bilirubin passes from the liver into the intestines with bile. It's then excreted in stool.

People with Gilbert syndrome have approximately 30% of normal bilirubin-UGT enzyme function, which contributes to a lower rate of glucuronidation of unconjugated bilirubin. This substance then accumulates in the body, causing mild hyperbilirubinemia.

== Genetics ==
Gilbert syndrome is a phenotypic effect, mostly associated with increased blood bilirubin levels, but also sometimes characterized by mild jaundice due to increased unconjugated bilirubin, that arises from several different genotypic variants of the gene for the enzyme responsible for changing bilirubin to the conjugated form.

Gilbert's syndrome is characterized by a 70–80% reduction in the glucuronidation activity of the enzyme UGT1A1. The UGT1A1 gene is located on human chromosome 2.

More than 100 polymorphisms of the UGT1A1 gene are known, designated as UGT1A1*n (where n is the general chronological order of discovery), either of the gene itself or of its promoter region. UGT1A1 is associated with a TATA box promoter region; this region most commonly contains the genetic sequence A(TA)_{6}TAA; this variant accounts for about 50% of alleles in many populations. However, several allelic polymorphic variants of this region occur, the most common of which results from adding another dinucleotide repeat TA to the promoter region, resulting in A(TA)_{7}TAA, which is called UGT1A1*28; this common variant accounts for about 40% of alleles in some populations, but is seen less often, around 3% of alleles, in Southeast and East Asian people and Pacific Islanders.

In most populations, Gilbert syndrome is most commonly associated with homozygous A(TA)_{7}TAA alleles. In 94% of GS cases, two other glucuronosyltransferase enzymes, UGT1A6 (rendered 50% inactive) and UGT1A7 (rendered 83% ineffective), are also affected.

However, Gilbert syndrome can arise without TATA box promoter polymorphic variants; in some populations, particularly healthy Southeast and East Asians, Gilbert's syndrome is more often a consequence of heterozygote missense mutations (such as Gly71Arg also known as UGT1A1*6, Tyr486Asp also known as UGT1A1*7, Pro364Leu also known as UGT1A1*73) in the actual gene coding region, which may be associated with significantly higher bilirubin levels.

Because of its effects on drug and bilirubin breakdown and because of its genetic inheritance, Gilbert's syndrome can be classed as a minor inborn error of metabolism.

== Diagnosis ==
Gilbert syndrome is typically diagnosed based on clinical findings and laboratory results, emphasizing the exclusion of other potential causes of elevated bilirubin levels. The key criteria include:

1. Mild, Unconjugated Hyperbilirubinemia:
  - Total serum bilirubin levels are mildly elevated, typically remaining below 6 mg/dL (102 μmol/L), with a predominance of the unconjugated (indirect) fraction.
2. Normal Liver Function Tests:
  - Liver enzymes, including alanine aminotransferase (ALT) and aspartate aminotransferase (AST), are within normal ranges, indicating no underlying liver disease.
3. Absence of Hemolysis:
  - No evidence of increased red blood cell breakdown, as indicated by normal hemoglobin levels and reticulocyte counts.
4. Intermittent Nature of Symptoms:
  - Episodes of jaundice that may be triggered by factors such as fasting, illness, stress, or exertion, with no other associated symptoms. The level of total bilirubin is often further increased if the blood sample is taken after fasting for two days, and a fast can, therefore, be useful diagnostically. A further conceptual step that is rarely necessary or appropriate is to give a low dose of phenobarbital: the bilirubin will decrease substantially.
5. Exclusion of Other Liver Disorders:
  - No clinical or laboratory evidence of other liver diseases; imaging studies and serologic tests for hepatitis are negative.
6. Genetic Testing:
  - Identification of mutations in the UGT1A1 gene can confirm the diagnosis of Gilbert syndrome. While not routinely required, genetic testing may be considered in cases where the diagnosis is uncertain or to provide reassurance to patients.

=== Differential diagnosis ===
While Gilbert syndrome is considered harmless, it is clinically important because it may give rise to a concern about a blood or liver condition, which could be more dangerous. However, these conditions have additional indicators:

- In Gilbert syndrome, unless another disease of the liver is also present, the liver enzymes ALT/SGPT and AST/SGOT, as well as albumin, are within normal ranges.
- Crigler–Najjar syndrome (types I and II), a different glucuronyl transferase disorder, is much more severe, with 0–10% UGT1A1 activity, with affected individuals at risk of brain damage in infancy (type I) and teenage years (type II).
- Hemolysis of any cause can be excluded by a full blood count, haptoglobin, lactate dehydrogenase levels, and the absence of reticulocytosis (elevated reticulocytes in the blood would usually be observed in haemolytic anaemia).
- Dubin–Johnson syndrome and Rotor syndrome are rarer autosomal recessive disorders characterized by an increase of conjugated bilirubin.
- Viral hepatitis associated with increase of conjugated bilirubin can be excluded by negative blood samples for antigens specific to the different hepatitis viruses.
- Cholestasis can be excluded by normal levels of bile acids in plasma, the absence of lactate dehydrogenase, low levels of conjugated bilirubin, and ultrasound scan of the bile ducts.
- Vitamin B_{12} deficiency – elevated bilirubin levels (and MCV counts above 90–92) can be associated with a vitamin B_{12} deficiency.

== Treatment ==
Gilbert's syndrome is a benign condition that typically requires no medical treatment. The primary approach involves patient education and reassurance about the harmless nature of the syndrome. Episodes of jaundice, when they occur, are usually mild and resolve on their own without intervention. To minimize the frequency of these episodes, individuals are advised to avoid known triggers such as fasting, dehydration, stress, and strenuous physical exertion. Maintaining a healthy lifestyle, including regular meals and adequate hydration, can help manage the condition effectively. If jaundice is significant, phenobarbital may be used.

== Research directions ==
=== Vitamin levels ===
Studies conducted so far suggest that subjects with GS may have lower levels of vitamin D and folic acid than control subjects, having these levels inversely correlated with bilirubin levels. It may be that GS may impair the metabolism or absorption of these vitamins, or that these vitamins may affect the expression or activity of the UGT1A1 enzyme that is responsible for bilirubin conjugation. However, these studies had limitations, such as the small sample size, the lack of a standardized definition of GS, the possible confounding factors of diet, lifestyle, and medication use, and the cross-sectional and observational design that does not allow for causal inference.

=== The role of bilirubin in health and disease ===
Ongoing studies suggest that mild hyperbilirubinemia in GS may have beneficial effects, probably due to bilirubin's antioxidant and anti-inflammatory properties. Hyperbilirubinemia in GS may protect against oxidative stress and inflammation-related diseases, such as cardiovascular diseases, cancers, diabetes, and neurodegenerative disorders. However, the mechanisms and pathways of bilirubin protection are not fully explained, and the optimal level and range of bilirubin are unknown. The genetic and environmental factors that influence UGT1A1 expression and activity are also poorly characterized and may affect the variability and penetrance of GS. Despite the fact that hyperbilirubinemia in GS is associated with reduced incidence of cardiovascular diseases, diabetes, and metabolic syndrome, the clinical significance and implications of these GS research findings are unclear, and can not yet be translated into preventive or therapeutic strategies.

== History ==
Gilbert syndrome was first described by French gastroenterologist Augustin Nicolas Gilbert and co-workers in 1901. In German literature, it is commonly associated with Jens Einar Meulengracht.

Alternative, less common names for this disorder include:

- Familial benign unconjugated hyperbilirubinaemia
- Constitutional liver dysfunction
- Familial non-hemolytic non-obstructive jaundice
- Icterus intermittens juvenilis
- Low-grade chronic hyperbilirubinemia
- Unconjugated benign bilirubinemia

== Society and culture ==
=== Notable cases ===
- Napoleon – French general and emperor
- Arthur Kornberg – Nobel laureate in Physiology or Medicine, 1959
- Nicky Wire, Manic Street Preachers – bassist
- Alexandr Dolgopolov – tennis player
- Jonas Folger – MotoGP rider
