= C10H18O3 =

The molecular formula C_{10}H_{18}O_{3} (molar mass: 186.25 g/mol, exact mass: 186.1256 u) may refer to:

- Cyclobutyrol (CB)
- Epomediol
- Queen bee acid (or 10-HDA)
- Valeric acid anhydride (or valeryl-valerate)
