= Guinau language =

Extinct Arawakan language of Venezuela

Guinau
- Temoːme̥yé̱ːmẽ̥
- Native to: Venezuela
- Region: Merevarí River
- Ethnicity: Guinau
- Extinct: (date missing)
- Language family: Arawakan: Rio Negro; Guinau

Language codes
- ISO 639-3: None (mis)
- Glottolog: guin1258
- Linguasphere: 82-AHA-ab

Guinau (Temomeyéme, Guinau: Temoːme̥yé̱ːmẽ̥) is an extinct Arawakan language of Venezuela, formerly spoken along the Merevarí River, a tributary of the Caura River. It has been sometimes considered a dialect of closely related Baré. It is classified in the Rio Negro branch by Ramirez and França (2019). The Guinau were absorbed into the Yeꞌkuana before 1991.

Robert Hermann Schomburgk described the Guinau and their language as follows:

The Guinaus inhabit the mountains, between the fourth and fifth parallel of north latitude, and the meridians 63 1/2° and 65° west from Greenwich. The greater number are settled on the banks of the Merewari (Mareguare of the Spanish maps), and its tributaries, which, with the Erevato, form the river Caura or Caora, a tributary of the great Orinoco. This tribe is not numerous, and their settlements are frequently intermixed with Maiongkongs. They are famed for the manufacture of blowpipes, which they exchange for Urari poison, that of all Guianians the Macusis know the best to prepare. Their language contains words of Caribi-Tamanakan origin, but it possesses many peculiarities which stamps it as a dialect that is only distantly related to this section, and may hereafter be separated from it.

== Vocabulary ==
=== Schomburgk (1848) ===
⟨ae, ui⟩ represent one sound.

Guinau	Gloss	Guinau	Gloss	Guinau	Gloss
nisi	hair	totoli	knee	yamkassi	forest
intshebu	head	katabu	leg	wamityo	savannah
teiburri	front	unkui	ankle	tshaeke-weima	firewood
‘nawisi	eyes	intshibe	foot	tsaba	mountain
intseibu	eyelashes	intshibihanshi	toes	tshiba	rock
intseibitzi	eyebrow	intshibi-arahu	large toe	tshimari-tshebi	bow
‘nawisi tate	eyelid	intshibi-hityu	little toe	tshimari	arrow
intshe	nose	abba	father	wataba	blowpipe
‘noma	mouth	amma	mother	hoih	war club
intariha	lips	papa aeyeweni	grandfather	makuri	poisoned arrow
‘nahae	teeth	paki homorra	grandmother	ennehri	poisoned blowdart
tashini	tongue	yaenari	son	takaru	basket for carrying burdens
‘nuabbi	neck	integh	daughter	tshachi	basket peculiar to the Guinau
kaukshi	cheeks	enari	husband^{1}	umatagh	pot
kakuta	chin	hennau	wife	urukuma	matappa
intsanima	beard	yiwieni	brother	manari	sieve for sifting cassava flour
‘noaku	shoulder	matyu	sister	tshiba	cassava rasp or grater
takanne	elbow	apaharikari, apaheu	man	manokanna	jaguar
inkabo-akui	wrist	arriekyebo, apahoko	woman	murayu	forest deer
inkabo	hand	emi	boy	purrika	"savannah deer" (Pampas deer?)
kabhanshi	finger	hinahutyu	girl	karriaku	"smallest deer" (gray brocket?)
nabau-ita	fingernail	kati	earth	kwashi	dog
inkabo-yau	thumb	tsheke	fire	tsaema	tapir
inkabo	first finger	waenu	heaven	weiyurumish	agouti
inkabo-yetsebi	second finger	kamuhu	sun	weiyuru	laba
inkabo-metahi	third finger	kewari	moon	ontsaha	fish
inkabo-hityuna	little finger	yuwinti	stars	wamiri	cock
intana	arm	kaburitu	clouds	hinnau	hen
untoko	breast	awetshi	wind	merishi	collared peccary
undura	belly	hia	rain	kerauka	white-lipped peccary
taiïburu	navel	keimari	thunder	wuisha	calabash
‘nishinni	heart	kanhi	lightning	paru	plantain
pashita	ribs	oni	water	mekuru	banana
‘naeta	skin	arahauko	river	kantyeri	cassava
‘nuiya	blood	pani	house	tsari	cassava bread
‘naetina	flesh	moimahi	grass	teweshi	yam
‘nabi	back	tamon-hiha	tree	ka-uh	sweet potato
pashi	thigh	tamona-yeka	flower	urari	curare poison

Guinau	Gloss	Guinau	Gloss
yawari	coaita	kewakanni	day
piyawu	bat	ewi	knife
wari	savnnah dog	supara	cutlass
kabihi	South American coati	maria	axe
ibiha	yawari	wotshi	fishhooks
tebishima	pale-throated sloth	mavassi	razor
waetu	nine-banded armadillo	kirre-kirre	file
marano	Brazilian three-banded armadillo	meiyuru	glass beads
keyu	capybara	kurarashi	red glass beads
kurishai	Brazilian porcupine	irashi	scissors
ikuri	giant anteater	wannamari	looking glass
karihu	Brazilian squirrel	arripiriru	pin
muna	Bolivian river dolphin	makutsi	needle
kukui	harpy eagle	tsaeworrioko	blue, green
kweh	toco toucan	kannioko	red
tshiwari	black curassow	kritoko	yellow
dako	bellbird	kahauko	black
iïya	hoatzin	parioko	white
kwano	rock manakin	aha	yes
maradi	guan	egho marina	no
kuyuwi	white-headed guan	nia	to weep
karima	anhinga	tshakeitaba akakutyu	to laugh
tujuju	jabiru		
marima	cocoi heron		
wanare	waccara (white crane)		
kunashimitzi	roseate spoonbill		
huroma	Muscovy duck		
visishiu	white-faced whistling duck		
kuttua	neotropic cormorant		
warrara	Arrau turtle		
tarrikea	"small turtle"		
kaiman	American crocodile		
arraiyemanno	lizard		
warramaka	green iguana		
turraena	timber rattlesnake		
mattari	boa constrictor		
tshibau	frog		
tukurau	blacksmith tree frog		
timarui	ocellate river stingray		
umaha	redeye piranha		
yarinuni	Electrophorus electricus		
mawishi	blunt shell		
kuibashi	"savannah shell"		
matutu	shell sp.		
takutaku	shell sp.		
toma-kurimashi	crab		
tshitabo	shrimp		
tsiwoyu	scorpion		
araru	tarantula		
ikyeba	Scolopendra morsitans		
tawai	grasshopper		
hannejo	mosquito		
tshika	Tunga penetrans		
mawni	sandfly		
ureta	flea		
tshaeweta	louse		
pareita	1		
yamika	2		
piampatyam	3		
kereha	4		
abba kawika	5		
yamunakatsi	6		
abba kabo watyam kab	8		
tshannaha ishaka akati	9		
abba kubba-kack	10		
tshohi	north		
abbabatassi	south		
kamahu atsina	east		
kamahu asslabo	west		
kibau	night		

=== Notes ===
1. Also means "'man' in a general sense"
