= Methylnicotinamide =

Methylnicotinamide may refer to:

- 1-Methylnicotinamide (trigonellamide)
- N-Methylnicotinamide (nicotinyl methylamide)
