= Sodium/bile acid cotransporter =

Protein found in humans

SLC10A1

Identifiers
- Aliases: SLC10A1, NTCP, solute carrier family 10 member 1, FHCA2
- External IDs: OMIM: 182396; MGI: 97379; GeneCards: SLC10A1

Gene location (Human)
Chr.	Chromosome 14 (human)
Band	14q24.1	Start	69,775,416 bp
Band	14q24.1	End	69,797,241 bp

Gene location (Mouse)
Chr.	Chromosome 12 (mouse)
Band	12 D1|12 37.21 cM	Start	80,999,957 bp
Band	12 D1|12 37.21 cM	End	81,015,479 bp
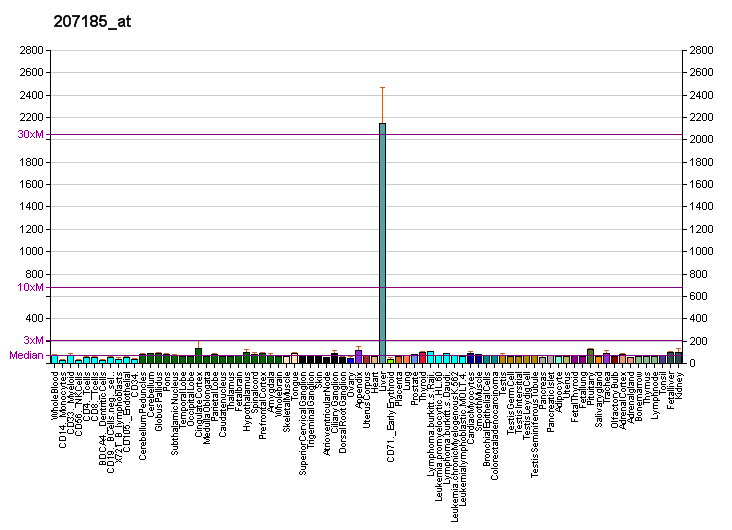
RNA expression pattern
Bgee	Human / Mouse (ortholog); Top expressed in: right lobe of liver; testicle; sural nerve; Achilles tendon; granulocyte; internal globus pallidus; gallbladder; muscle of thigh; kidney; blood / Top expressed in: left lobe of liver; gallbladder; sexually immature organism; embryo; granulocyte; zygote; blastocyst; morula; morula; thoracic diaphragm; More reference expression data
BioGPS	More reference expression data
Gene ontology
Molecular function	bile acid transmembrane transporter activity; symporter activity; virus receptor activity; bile acid:sodium symporter activity
Cellular component	integral component of membrane; plasma membrane; basolateral plasma membrane; integral component of plasma membrane; membrane
Biological process	sodium ion transport; viral entry into host cell; viral process; ion transport; transmembrane transport; bile acid and bile salt transport
Sources:Amigo / QuickGO
Orthologs
Databases	NCBI: entry; OMA: entry
Species	Human	Mouse
Entrez	6554	20493
Ensembl	ENSG00000100652	ENSMUSG00000021135
UniProt	Q14973	O08705
RefSeq (mRNA)	NM_003049	NM_001177561; NM_011387; NM_001361972
RefSeq (protein)	NP_003040	NP_001171032; NP_035517; NP_001348901
Location (UCSC)	Chr 14: 69.78 – 69.8 Mb	Chr 12: 81 – 81.02 Mb
PubMed search
- Wikidata
View/Edit Human	View/Edit Mouse

Sodium/bile acid cotransporter also known as the Na^{+}-taurocholate cotransporting polypeptide (NTCP) or liver bile acid transporter (LBAT) is a protein that in humans is encoded by the SLC10A1 (solute carrier family 10 member 1) gene.

== Structure ==
Sodium/bile acid cotransporters are integral membrane glycoproteins. Human NTCP contains 349 amino acids and has a mass of 56 kDa.

== Function ==
Bile acid:sodium symporters participate in the enterohepatic circulation of bile acids. Two homologous transporters are involved in the reabsorption of bile acids. One of these absorbs bile acids from the intestinal lumen, the bile duct, and the kidney with an apical localization (ileal sodium/bile acid cotransporter). The other is this protein and is expressed in the basolateral membranes of hepatocytes (NTCP).

As a cotransporter, NTCP binds two sodium ions and one (conjugated) bile salt molecule, thereby providing a hepatic influx of bile salts. Other transported molecules include steroid hormones, thyroid hormones and various xenobiotics:

=== Hepatitis virus entry ===
NTCP is a cell surface receptor necessary for the entry of hepatitis B and hepatitis D virus. This entry mechanism is inhibited by myrcludex B, cyclosporin A, progesterone, propranolol, bosentan, ezetimibe, bexarotene as well as NTCP substrates like taurocholate, tauroursodeoxycholate and bromosulfophthalein.

=== SLC10A1-deficiency ===
Individuals that lack functional NTCP have been identified. These individuals display highly elevated bile salt levels in plasma, but without a clear phenotype. In areas of the world with a high prevalence of HBV, there are multiple individuals who carry the NTCP p.S267F polymorphism on both alleles; this makes NTCP inactive as a bile acid transporter, but provides protection against HBV infection.

NTCP-deficient mice have also been created. These mice have reduced hepatic bile salt uptake but plasma bile salt levels are less clearly elevated, as the rodent-specific OATP1a/1b transporters provide can partially replace the function of NTCP. Nevertheless, this NTCP-knockout animal model pointed to possible additional (non-HBV) aspects of NTCP-deficiency. NTCP-deficient mice are partially protected against the problems associated with a high-calorie diet, including excessive weight gain and to liver damage in cholestasis. These effects of NTCP deficiency have not yet been replicated in humans.

== See also ==
- Solute carrier family
