= Maralixibat chloride =

Chemical compound

Clinical data
- Trade names: Livmarli
- Other names: LUM001
- AHFS/Drugs.com: Monograph
- MedlinePlus: a621056
- License data: US DailyMed: Maralixibat chloride
- Routes of administration: By mouth
- Drug class: Ileal bile acid transporter (IBAT) inhibitor
- ATC code: A05AX04 (WHO)

Legal status
- Legal status: CA: ℞-only; US: ℞-only; EU: Rx-only

Identifiers
- IUPAC name: 1-[4-({4-[(4R,5R)-3,3-Dibutyl-7-(dimethylamino)-4-hydroxy-1,1-dioxido-2,3,4,5-tetrahydro-1-benzothiepin-5-yl]phenoxy}methyl)benzyl]-4-aza-1-azoniabicyclo[2.2.2]octane
- CAS Number: 716313-53-0; as salt: 228113-66-4
- DrugBank: DB16226; as salt: DBSALT003196
- ChemSpider: 8007375; as salt: 8007374
- UNII: UYB6UOF69L; as salt: V78M04F0XC
- KEGG: D10951; as salt: D10952
- ChEMBL: ChEMBL363392; as salt: ChEMBL17879
- CompTox Dashboard (EPA): DTXSID701337104

Chemical and physical data
- Formula: C_{40}H_{56}ClN_{3}O_{4}S
- Molar mass: 710.42 g·mol^{−1}
- 3D model (JSmol): Interactive image
- SMILES: CCCCC1(CCCC)CS(=O)(=O)C2=CC=C(C=C2[C@H]([C@H]1O)C1=CC=C(OCC2=CC=C(C[N+]34CCN(CC3)CC4)C=C2)C=C1)N(C)C
- InChI: InChI=1S/C40H56N3O4S/c1-5-7-19-40(20-8-6-2)30-48(45,46)37-18-15-34(41(3)4)27-36(37)38(39(40)44)33-13-16-35(17-14-33)47-29-32-11-9-31(10-12-32)28-43-24-21-42(22-25-43)23-26-43/h9-18,27,38-39,44H,5-8,19-26,28-30H2,1-4H3/q+1/t38-,39-/m1/s1; Key:STPKWKPURVSAJF-LJEWAXOPSA-N

Maralixibat chloride, sold under the brand name Livmarli, is a medication used to treat cholestatic pruritus in people with Alagille syndrome. Maralixibat chloride is an ileal bile acid transporter (IBAT) inhibitor.

The most common side effects include diarrhea and abdominal pain (belly ache).

Maralixibat chloride was approved for medical use in the United States in September 2021, and in the European Union in December 2022.

== Medical uses ==
Maralixibat chloride is indicated for the treatment of cholestatic pruritus in patients with Alagille syndrome.

== History ==
The U.S. Food and Drug Administration (FDA) granted the application for maralixibat chloride orphan drug designations in 2013, and in 2020.

== Society and culture ==
=== Legal status ===
In October 2022, the Committee for Medicinal Products for Human Use (CHMP) of the European Medicines Agency (EMA) adopted a positive opinion, recommending the granting of a marketing authorization under exceptional circumstances for the medicinal product Livmarli, intended for the treatment of cholestatic pruritus in patients with Alagille syndrome (ALGS). The applicant for this medicinal product is Mirum Pharmaceuticals International B.V. Maralixibat chloride was approved for medical use in the European Union in December 2022.

=== Names ===
Maralixibat chloride is the international nonproprietary name (INN).
