= Cholagogue =

Archaic term for agents promoting bile discharge

A cholagogue (/ˈkoʊlˈəˈɡɒɡ/ KOH-lə-gog; from Ancient Greek χολή (kholḗ) 'gall, bile' and ἀγωγός (agōgós) 'leading, guiding') is a substance that is purported by humoral practitioners to encourage the discharge of bile from the system, purging it downward. Deployment is no longer recommended because the biliary purge, like the traditional kidney purge, can cause pancreatic problems.

Cyclovalone is a choleretic and cholagogic agent.

== Literary References ==
In Patrick O'Brian's Post Captain, which is set in the Napoleonic era, Stephen Maturin, one of the book's main characters (who is also a physician, naturalist and spy) sits in the snug of the Rose and Crown in Deal, Kent, and drinks a "good" tea described as an "unrivalled cholagogue".

== See also ==
- Cholekinetic
- Hydrocholeretic
- Choleretic
