= Bile acid:sodium symporter =

SBF

Identifiers
- Symbol: SBF
- Pfam: PF01758
- Pfam clan: CL0064
- InterPro: IPR002657
- TCDB: 2.A.28
- OPM superfamily: 224
- OPM protein: 3zuy
Available protein structures:
- Pfam: structures / ECOD
- PDB: RCSB PDB; PDBe; PDBj
- PDBsum: structure summary

This family of proteins are found both in prokaryotes and eukaryotes. In mammals, they are transmembrane proteins with functions in the liver and in the intestine. They are members of the solute carrier family of cotransporter genes which include SLC10A1 and SLC10A2.

SLC10A1 encodes the sodium-taurocholate cotransporting polypeptide (NTCP) expressed in the liver and found on the basolateral membranes. It is involved in the uptake of all types of bile acids from portal blood plasma, a process mediated by the co-transport of Na^{+}. It is also capable of transporting other solutes and is necessary for the entry of hepatitis B and hepatitis D viruses into the hepatocyte.

SLC10A2 encodes the apical sodium bile acid transporter (ASBT) expressed in the small intestine with highest concentrations in the ileum. It is found on the brush border membrane and is also known as the ileal bile acid transporter (IBAT). It is responsible for the initial uptake of bile acids from the intestine as part of the enterohepatic circulation. Inhibition of the intestinal bile acid:sodium cotransporter by elobixibat is under development for the treatment of constipation and irritable bowel syndrome.
