= OKG =

OKG may refer to:

- OKG AB
- Okoyo Airport
- Ornithine α-ketoglutarate
