= Piprozolin =

Chemical compound

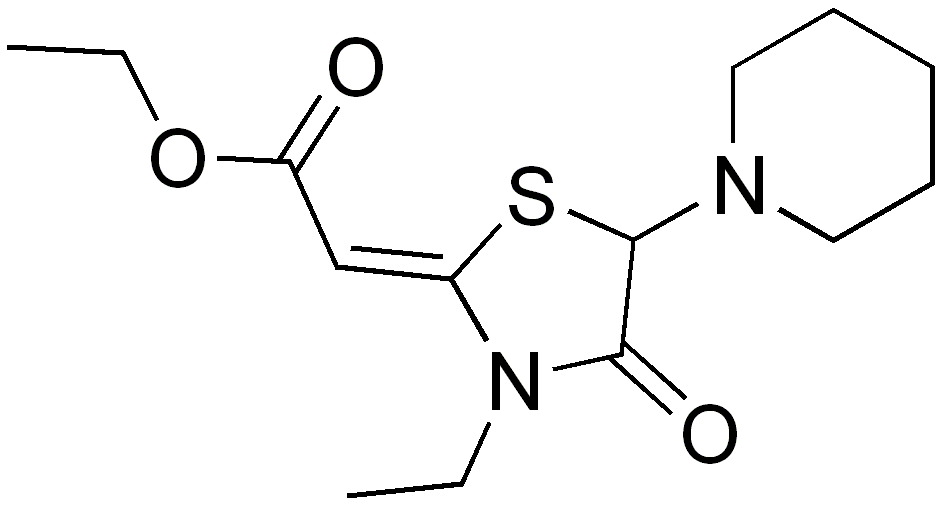

Clinical data
- ATC code: A05AX01 (WHO)

Identifiers
- IUPAC name: Ethyl (2Z)-2-(3-ethyl-4-oxo-5-piperidin-1-yl-1,3-thiazolidin-2-ylidene)acetate
- CAS Number: 17243-64-0
- PubChem CID: 5911905
- ChemSpider: 4744588
- UNII: 7786W0VV8M
- ChEMBL: ChEMBL2105231
- CompTox Dashboard (EPA): DTXSID70864757
- ECHA InfoCard: 100.037.512

Chemical and physical data
- Formula: C_{14}H_{22}N_{2}O_{3}S
- Molar mass: 298.40 g·mol^{−1}
- InChI: InChI=1S/C14H22N2O3S/c1-3-16-11(10-12(17)19-4-2)20-14(13(16)18)15-8-6-5-7-9-15/h10,14H,3-9H2,1-2H3/b11-10-; Key:UAXYBJSAPFTPNB-KHPPLWFESA-N

Piprozolin (or piprozoline) is a medication for bile therapy.

== Synthesis ==
Compared to fenclozic acid, piprozolin shows choleretic rather than anti-inflammatory activity. That is, the compound is useful in those conditions where the flow of bile is to be increased.

Piprozolin synthesis:

Condensation of ethyl mercaptoacetate with ethyl cyanoacetate leads to thiazolinone (4); an intermediate such as 3, involving addition of the mercaptide to the nitrile function can reasonably be invoked. M/ethylation with di(m)ethyl sulfate proceeds on nitrogen with the concomitant shift of the enamine to afford olefin (5). Bromination of the active methylene (6) followed by displacement of halogen by piperidine affords the choleretic piprozolin (7).
