= Bulevirtide =

Antiviral medication

Clinical data
- Pronunciation: /bjuːˈlɛvɪrtaɪd/ byoo-LEH-vir-tyde
- Trade names: Hepcludex
- Other names: MyrB, Myrcludex-B, bulevirtide-gmod
- AHFS/Drugs.com: Monograph
- MedlinePlus: a626071
- License data: US DailyMed: Bulevirtide
- Pregnancy category: AU: B1
- Routes of administration: Subcutaneous
- Drug class: Antiviral
- ATC code: J05AX28 (WHO)

Legal status
- Legal status: AU: S4 (Prescription only); CA: ℞-only; UK: POM (Prescription only); US: ℞-only; EU: Rx-only

Identifiers
- CAS Number: 2012558-47-1
- DrugBank: DB15248
- ChemSpider: 129157549
- UNII: WKM56H3TLB
- KEGG: D11877; as salt: D11878
- ChEMBL: ChEMBL4297711

Chemical and physical data
- Formula: C_{248}H_{355}N_{65}O_{72}
- Molar mass: 5398.951 g·mol^{−1}
- 3D model (JSmol): Interactive image
- SMILES: CCCCCCCCCCCCCC(=O)NCC(=O)N[C@H](C(=O)N[C@@H](CC(N)=O)C(=O)N[C@@H](CC(C)C)C(=O)N[C@@H](CO)C(=O)N[C@H](C(=O)N1CCC[C@H]1C(=O)N[C@@H](CC(N)=O)C(=O)N1CCC[C@H]1C(=O)N[C@@H](CC(C)C)C(=O)NCC(=O)N[C@@H](Cc1ccccc1)C(=O)N[C@@H](Cc1ccccc1)C(=O)N1CCC[C@H]1C(=O)N[C@@H](CC(=O)O)C(=O)N[C@@H](Cc1c[nH]cn1)C(=O)N[C@@H](CCC(N)=O)C(=O)N[C@@H](CC(C)C)C(=O)N[C@@H](CC(=O)O)C(=O)N1CCC[C@H]1C(=O)N[C@@H](C)C(=O)N[C@@H](Cc1ccccc1)C(=O)NCC(=O)N[C@@H](C)C(=O)N[C@@H](CC(N)=O)C(=O)N[C@@H](CO)C(=O)N[C@@H](CC(N)=O)C(=O)N[C@@H](CC(N)=O)C(=O)N1CCC[C@H]1C(=O)N[C@@H](CC(=O)O)C(=O)N[C@@H](Cc1c[nH]c2ccccc12)C(=O)N[C@@H](CC(=O)O)C(=O)N[C@@H](Cc1ccccc1)C(=O)N[C@@H](CC(N)=O)C(=O)N1CCC[C@H]1C(=O)N[C@@H](CC(N)=O)C(=O)N[C@@H](CCCCN)C(=O)N[C@@H](CC(=O)O)C(=O)N[C@@H](Cc1c[nH]cn1)C(=O)N[C@@H](Cc1c[nH]c2ccccc12)C(=O)N1CCC[C@H]1C(=O)N[C@@H](CCC(=O)O)C(=O)N[C@@H](C)C(=O)N[C@@H](CC(N)=O)C(=O)N[C@@H](CCCCN)C(=O)N[C@H](C(=O)NCC(N)=O)C(C)C)C(C)C)[C@@H](C)O
- InChI: InChI=1S/C248H355N65O72/c1-16-17-18-19-20-21-22-23-24-25-38-75-193(327)265-118-196(330)304-205(133(15)316)241(378)295-163(104-188(256)322)224(361)283-152(91-127(6)7)216(353)303-175(122-315)232(369)306-204(129(10)11)248(385)313-88-53-74-182(313)239(376)301-172(107-191(259)325)246(383)312-87-50-70-178(312)235(372)291-150(89-125(2)3)209(346)268-120-195(329)274-154(93-135-56-32-27-33-57-135)217(354)296-168(95-137-60-36-29-37-61-137)242(379)308-83-49-72-180(308)237(374)294-167(111-201(339)340)230(367)286-157(98-140-115-261-123-269-140)220(357)277-148(76-78-183(251)317)213(350)282-151(90-126(4)5)215(352)300-173(112-202(341)342)247(384)307-82-47-68-176(307)233(370)273-132(14)208(345)279-153(92-134-54-30-26-31-55-134)210(347)267-119-194(328)271-130(12)206(343)280-160(101-185(253)319)226(363)302-174(121-314)231(368)288-161(102-186(254)320)225(362)299-171(106-190(258)324)245(382)311-86-52-73-181(311)238(375)293-166(110-200(337)338)229(366)285-156(96-138-113-263-144-64-41-39-62-142(138)144)219(356)290-165(109-199(335)336)227(364)284-155(94-136-58-34-28-35-59-136)218(355)298-170(105-189(257)323)244(381)310-85-51-71-179(310)236(373)292-162(103-187(255)321)223(360)275-146(66-43-45-80-249)212(349)289-164(108-198(333)334)228(365)287-158(99-141-116-262-124-270-141)221(358)297-169(97-139-114-264-145-65-42-40-63-143(139)145)243(380)309-84-48-69-177(309)234(371)278-149(77-79-197(331)332)211(348)272-131(13)207(344)281-159(100-184(252)318)222(359)276-147(67-44-46-81-250)214(351)305-203(128(8)9)240(377)266-117-192(260)326/h26-37,39-42,54-65,113-116,123-133,146-182,203-205,263-264,314-316H,16-25,38,43-53,66-112,117-122,249-250H2,1-15H3,(H2,251,317)(H2,252,318)(H2,253,319)(H2,254,320)(H2,255,321)(H2,256,322)(H2,257,323)(H2,258,324)(H2,259,325)(H2,260,326)(H,261,269)(H,262,270)(H,265,327)(H,266,377)(H,267,347)(H,268,346)(H,271,328)(H,272,348)(H,273,370)(H,274,329)(H,275,360)(H,276,359)(H,277,357)(H,278,371)(H,279,345)(H,280,343)(H,281,344)(H,282,350)(H,283,361)(H,284,364)(H,285,366)(H,286,367)(H,287,365)(H,288,368)(H,289,349)(H,290,356)(H,291,372)(H,292,373)(H,293,375)(H,294,374)(H,295,378)(H,296,354)(H,297,358)(H,298,355)(H,299,362)(H,300,352)(H,301,376)(H,302,363)(H,303,353)(H,304,330)(H,305,351)(H,306,369)(H,331,332)(H,333,334)(H,335,336)(H,337,338)(H,339,340)(H,341,342)/t130-,131-,132-,133+,146-,147-,148-,149-,150-,151-,152-,153-,154-,155-,156-,157-,158-,159-,160-,161-,162-,163-,164-,165-,166-,167-,168-,169-,170-,171-,172-,173-,174-,175-,176-,177-,178-,179-,180-,181-,182-,203-,204-,205-/m0/s1; Key:WQNDXLHKAMIGEX-WOAPPVHJSA-N

Bulevirtide, sold under the brand name Hepcludex, is an antiviral medication used for the treatment of chronic hepatitis D.

The most common side effects include raised levels of bile salts in the blood and reactions at the site of injection.

Bulevirtide works by attaching to and blocking a receptor (target) through which the hepatitis delta and hepatitis B viruses enter liver cells. By blocking the entry of the virus into the cells, it limits the ability of HDV to replicate and its effects in the body, reducing symptoms of the disease.

Bulevirtide was approved for medical use in the European Union in July 2020, in Canada in August 2025, and in the United States in May 2026.

== Medical uses ==
Bulevirtide is indicated for the treatment of chronic hepatitis delta virus (HDV) infection in plasma (or serum) HDV-RNA positive adult patients with compensated liver disease.

Hepatitis delta virus infection only occurs in individuals who have hepatitis B virus infection.

== Pharmacology ==
=== Mechanism of action ===
Bulevirtide binds and inactivates the sodium/bile acid cotransporter, blocking both hepatitis B and hepatitis D viruses from entering hepatocytes.

The hepatitis B virus uses its surface lipopeptide pre-S1 for docking to mature liver cells via their sodium/bile acid cotransporter (NTCP) and subsequently entering the cells. Myrcludex B is a synthetic N-acylated pre-S1 that can also dock to NTCP, blocking the virus's entry mechanism.

Bulevirtide is also effective against hepatitis D because the hepatitis D virus uses the same entry receptor as the hepatitis B virus and is only effective in the presence of a hepatitis B virus infection.

Pre-clinical data in mice suggests that pharmacological inhibition of NTCP-mediated bile salt uptake may also be effective to lower hepatic bile salt accumulation in cholestatic conditions. This reduces hepatocellular damage. An increased ratio of phospholipid to bile salts seen in bile upon NTCP inhibition may further contribute to the protective effect as bile salts are less toxic in presence of phospholipids.

== Chemistry ==
Bulevirtide is a 47-amino acid long lipopeptide with the following sequence:

CH_{3}(CH_{2})_{12}CO-Gly-Thr-Asn-Leu-Ser-Val-Pro-Asn-Pro-Leu-Gly-Phe-Phe-Pro-Asp-His-Gln-Leu-Asp-Pro-Ala-Phe-Gly-Ala-Asn-Ser-Asn-Asn-Pro-Asp-Trp-Asp-Phe-Asn-Pro-Asn-Lys-Asp-His-Trp-Pro-Glu-Ala-Asn-Lys-Val-Gly-NH_{2} (C_{13}H_{27}CO-GTNLSVPNPLGFFPDHQLDPAFGANSNNPDWDFNPNKDHWPEANKVG-NH_{2})

== History ==
The efficacy of bulevirtide was demonstrated in a multi-center, randomized, open-label, parallel-arm phase III trial. In Trial MYR301, participants were randomly assigned to immediate treatment with bulevirtide 8.5 mg once daily for 144 weeks or to delayed treatment with an observational period of 48 weeks followed by bulevirtide 8.5 mg once daily for 96 weeks.

== Society and culture ==
=== Legal status ===
Bulevirtide was approved for medical use in the European Union in July 2020, in Canada in August 2025, and in the United States in May 2026. The US Food and Drug Administration granted the application for bulevirtide priority review, breakthrough therapy, and orphan drug designations.

=== Names ===
Bulevirtide is the international nonproprietary name.

Bulevirtide is sold under the brand name.Hepcludex.
