= Metadoxine =

Medication used for alcohol intoxication

Clinical data
- Routes of administration: Oral, IV
- ATC code: A05BA09 (WHO)

Identifiers
- IUPAC name: L-Proline, 5-oxo-, compd. with 5-hydroxy-6-methylpyridine-3,4-dimethanol (1:1)
- CAS Number: 74536-44-0
- PubChem CID: 115198
- ChemSpider: 103074
- UNII: EJQ7M98H5J
- CompTox Dashboard (EPA): DTXSID80996053
- ECHA InfoCard: 100.070.809

Chemical and physical data
- Formula: C_{13}H_{18}N_{2}O_{6}
- Molar mass: 298.295 g·mol^{−1}
- 3D model (JSmol): Interactive image
- SMILES: Cc1c(c(c(cn1)CO)CO)O.C1CC(=O)N[C@@H]1C(=O)O
- InChI: InChI=1S/C8H11NO3.C5H7NO3/c1-5-8(12)7(4-11)6(3-10)2-9-5;7-4-2-1-3(6-4)5(8)9/h2,10-12H,3-4H2,1H3;3H,1-2H2,(H,6,7)(H,8,9)/t;3-/m.0/s1; Key:RYKKQQUKJJGFMN-HVDRVSQOSA-N

Metadoxine, also known as pyridoxine-pyrrolidone carboxylate, is a drug used to treat chronic and acute alcohol intoxication. Metadoxine accelerates alcohol clearance from the blood.

Metadoxine is an ion pair salt of pyridoxine and pyrrolidone carboxylate (PCA). Pyridoxine (vitamin B_{6}) is a precursor of coenzymes including pyridoxal 5’-phosphate (PLP), which accelerates the metabolic degradation of ethanol and prevents adenosine triphosphate (ATP) inactivation by acetaldehyde. Pyridoxal phosphate dependent enzymes also play a role in the biosynthesis of four important neurotransmitters: serotonin (5-HT), epinephrine, norepinephrine and GABA: see vitamin B_{6} functions.

== Medical uses ==
As a treatment for alcohol intoxication and liver disease, metadoxine is typically given intravenously as immediate release formulation.

=== Acute alcohol intoxication ===
In clinical studies, metadoxine has been reported to reduce the half-life of ethanol in healthy volunteers and in acutely intoxicated patients; to accelerate the metabolism of alcohol and acetaldehyde into less toxic higher ketones and to improve their urinary clearance; to restore laboratory variables such as alcohol, ammonia, γ-GT, and alanine aminotransferase; and to improve clinical symptoms of alcohol intoxication, including psychomotor agitation, depression, aggressiveness, and equilibrium disorders. There is also evidence that metadoxine has an effect on reducing craving for alcohol. Data from clinical studies also support an effect of metadoxine on reducing indices of liver cell necrosis and fat accumulation in alcoholic fatty liver.

=== Liver disease ===
Metadoxine may block the differentiation step of preadipocytes by inhibiting CREB phosphorylation and binding to the cAMP response element, thereby repressing CCAAT/enhancer-binding protein b during hormone-induced adipogenesis. Metadoxine, when given in an immediate release form in doses from 300 mg twice a day to 500 mg three times a day of up to 3 months, has been shown to improve biochemical indices of liver function as well as reduce ultrasonic evidence of fatty liver disease.

== Pharmacology ==
=== Mechanism of action ===
Metadoxine is a selective antagonist of the serotonin receptor subtype 5-HT_{2B} and displays high affinity to the gamma-aminobutyric acid (GABA) transporter. In vitro enzymatic assay revealed that metadoxine reduced the activity of the GABA transaminase enzyme, responsible for the degradation of GABA. Electrophysiological studies also showed that metadoxine increased inhibitory GABAergic synaptic transmission via a presynaptic effect. As it does not affect dopamine, norepinephrine or serotonin levels, metadoxine displays a novel mechanism of action as a monoamine-independent GABA modulator.

In animal studies, metadoxine increased the activity of acetaldehyde dehydrogenase enzyme, prevented the decrease in alcohol dehydrogenase activity in chronic ethanol-fed rats, accelerated plasma and urinary clearance of ethanol, inhibited the increase of fatty acid esters in the liver of ethanol-treated rats, prevented the formation of fatty liver in rats exposed to a dose of ethanol sufficient to induce fatty liver, increased glutathione levels in the hepatocytes of acutely and chronically alcohol-intoxicated rats, prevented glutathione depletion, lipid peroxidation damage, collagen deposition, and TNF-α secretions induced by alcohol and acetaldehyde in hepatocytes and hepatic stellate cells.

== History ==
Metadoxine is predominantly used as metadoxine immediate release formulation in developing nations for acute alcohol intoxication and chronic alcoholic liver disease. Alternate names include:

- Abrixone (Eurodrug, Mexico)
- Alcotel (Il Yang, South Korea)
- Ganxin (Qidu Pharmaceutical, China)
- Metadoxil (Baldacci, Brazil; Baldacci Georgia; Baldacci, Italy; Baldacci, Lithuania; CSC, Russian Federation; Eurodrug, Colombia; Eurodrug, Hungary; Eurodrug, Thailand)
- NEXT LABS (India)
- Alkodez ІС (Ukraine)
- Viboliv (Dr. Reddy's, India)
- EXTOL (Next Labs, India)
- Xin Li De (Zhenyuan Pharm, China)

== Research ==
=== ADHD ===
Attention deficit hyperactivity disorder (ADHD) is one of the most common neurobehavioral disorders of childhood and is among the most prevalent chronic health conditions affecting school-aged children. The core symptoms of ADHD include inattention, difficulty staying focused, hyperactivity, and impulsivity.

Metadoxine exhibited cognition enhancing effect in the rat social recognition animal model.

An extended release formulation of metadoxine (MDX), combining immediate and slow release formulations of metadoxine into a single oral dose, was developed to extend the half-life of the drug and to allow for the use of MDX in indications that require a longer therapeutic window, such as cognitive impairment-related disorders. MDX has demonstrated significant and clinically meaningful improvements in multiple measures of cognition, ADHD symptoms, and quality of life, across multiple studies of adults with ADHD.

Several Phase II ADHD studies demonstrated a consistent signal of efficacy reaching statistical significance, as measured by neuropsychological testing (such as the computerized Test of Variables of Attention (TOVA) in acute settings) and clinical scales (in chronic administration studies), with no treatment-related serious adverse events or major differences in adverse events profiles between drug and placebo groups. The most common adverse events were nausea, fatigue, and headache. A phase 3 study in 300 adults with ADHD was completed in 2014.

Alcobra Ltd., which was conducting the Phase III trial announced on January 17, 2017 that the drug had failed the trial. The failure announcement came a week after Alcobra won FDA agreement to review data collected to date in the MEASURE study and consider it in a future NDA submission of MDX for ADHD. The FDA also agreed to change a full clinical hold for the trial to a partial clinical hold pending review and approval of the company's proposed protocol for a 6-month, Phase I study to assess the potential relevance of adverse findings observed in long-term animal studies of metadoxine in relation to human exposure, Alcobra said.

=== Fragile X syndrome ===
Fragile X syndrome (FXS) is a genetic disorder that is the most common single gene cause of intellectual disability and autism. Individuals with FXS often have a number of behavioral symptoms, including cognitive impairment, inattention, hyperactivity, impulsivity, autistic symptoms, shyness, aggression, anxiety, hand flapping, hand biting, and a high sensitivity to being touched. Autism spectrum disorder is seen in approximately 30% of males and 20% of females with FXS, and an additional 30% of FXS individuals display autistic symptoms without having the autism diagnosis. ADHD is commonly diagnosed in FXS and has been reported to occur in 59-80% of individuals with FXS.

In a FXS animal model (Fmr1 knockout mouse model), metadoxine treatment improved behavioral impairments of learning, memory, and social interaction and reversed the overactivation of the biomarkers Akt and extracellular signal-regulated kinase (ERK) in blood and brain of juvenile and adult mice. Metadoxine also demonstrated restoration of abnormal neuronal morphology as well as reduced the exaggerated basal protein production, both implicated in the pathophysiology of FXS and presumed to be responsible for impaired learning and memory.

The safety and efficacy of MDX in adolescents and adults with FXS has been evaluated in a Phase II study, which was completed in 2015.
