= Elobixibat =

Chemical compound

Clinical data
- Routes of administration: By mouth
- ATC code: A06AX09 (WHO) QA06AX09 (WHO)

Identifiers
- IUPAC name: N-{(2R)-2-[({[3,3-Dibutyl-7-(methylsulfanyl)-1,1-dioxido-5-phenyl-2,3,4,5-tetrahydro-1,5-benzothiazepin-8-yl]oxy}acetyl)amino]-2-phenylacetyl}glycine
- CAS Number: 439087-18-0
- PubChem CID: 9939892
- DrugBank: DB12486
- ChemSpider: 8115513
- UNII: 865UEK4EJC
- KEGG: D10796
- ChEMBL: ChEMBL3039515
- CompTox Dashboard (EPA): DTXSID00195985

Chemical and physical data
- Formula: C_{36}H_{45}N_{3}O_{7}S_{2}
- Molar mass: 695.89 g·mol^{−1}
- 3D model (JSmol): Interactive image
- SMILES: O=C(O)CNC(=O)[C@@H](c1ccccc1)NC(=O)COc4cc3c(N(c2ccccc2)CC(CS3(=O)=O)(CCCC)CCCC)cc4SC
- InChI: InChI=InChI=1S/C36H45N3O7S2/c1-4-6-18-36(19-7-5-2)24-39(27-16-12-9-13-17-27)28-20-30(47-3)29(21-31(28)48(44,45)25-36)46-23-32(40)38-34(26-14-10-8-11-15-26)35(43)37-22-33(41)42/h8-17,20-21,34H,4-7,18-19,22-25H2,1-3H3,(H,37,43)(H,38,40)(H,41,42)/t34-/m1/s1; Key:XFLQIRAKKLNXRQ-UUWRZZSWSA-N

Elobixibat is an inhibitor of the ileal bile acid transporter (IBAT), undergoing development in clinical trials for the treatment of chronic constipation and irritable bowel syndrome with constipation (IBS-C).

== Mechanism of action ==
Elobixibat is an inhibitor of IBAT, which is an alternative name for the apical sodium bile acid transporter (ASBT) encoded by the SLC10A2 gene. ASBT/IBAT is a bile acid:sodium symporter responsible for the reuptake of bile acids in the ileum, the initial step in their enterohepatic circulation. By inhibiting the uptake of bile acids, elobixibat increases the bile acid concentration in the gut, and this accelerates intestinal passage and softens the stool. Following several phase II studies, it is now undergoing phase III trials.

== Drug development ==
The drug was developed by Albireo AB, who licensed it to Ferring Pharmaceuticals for further development and marketing. Albireo has partnered with Ajinomoto Pharmaceuticals, giving the Japan-based company the rights to further develop the drug and market it throughout Asia. In India, Dr. Reddy's Laboratories launched Elobixibat with brand name Bixibat in October 2024.
