= Arginine glutamate =

Combination drug

Combination of
- Arginine: amino acid
- Glutamic acid: amino acid

Clinical data
- AHFS/Drugs.com: International Drug Names
- ATC code: A05BA01 (WHO)

Identifiers
- CAS Number: 4320-30-3
- PubChem CID: 165268
- DrugBank: DB13207
- ChemSpider: 144883
- UNII: TU1X77K34Q
- ChEMBL: ChEMBL2104514
- CompTox Dashboard (EPA): DTXSID3030002
- ECHA InfoCard: 100.022.137

Arginine glutamate (also called glutargin) is a compound (a dipeptide) formed by the combination of the amino acids arginine and glutamic acid. It is used in liver therapy.
