= Citiolone =

Chemical compound

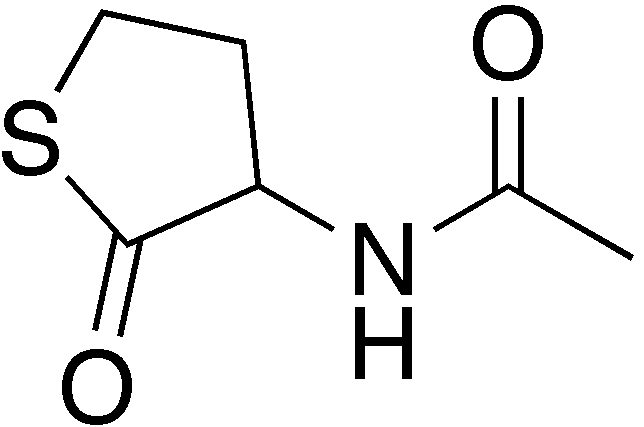

Clinical data
- ATC code: A05BA04 (WHO)

Identifiers
- IUPAC name: (RS)-N-(2-Oxothiolan-3-yl)acetamide
- CAS Number: 1195-16-0
- PubChem CID: 14520
- ChemSpider: 13864
- UNII: 70JKL15MUH
- KEGG: D07105
- ChEMBL: ChEMBL2104457
- CompTox Dashboard (EPA): DTXSID0045888
- ECHA InfoCard: 100.013.449

Chemical and physical data
- Formula: C_{6}H_{9}NO_{2}S
- Molar mass: 159.20 g·mol^{−1}
- InChI: InChI=1S/C6H9NO2S/c1-4(8)7-5-2-3-10-6(5)9/h5H,2-3H2,1H3,(H,7,8); Key:NRFJZTXWLKPZAV-UHFFFAOYSA-N

Citiolone is a drug used in liver therapy.

It is a derivative of the amino acid homocysteine. Citilone has also been studied with regard to hypothermia due to it being a hydroxyl free radical scavenger. The drug has been shown to protect hamster cells subjected to temperature conditions of 8-25 °C.
