= Volixibat =

Chemical compound

Clinical data
- Other names: N-(3-O-Benzyl-6-O-sulfo-β-D-glucopyranosyl)-N′-{3-[(3S,4R,5R)-3-butyl-7-(dimethylamino)-3-ethyl-4-hydroxy-1,1-dioxo-2,3,4,5-tetrahydro-1H-1λ^{6}-benzothiepin-5-yl]phenyl}urea; SHP626
- Routes of administration: By mouth

Legal status
- Legal status: Investigational

Identifiers
- IUPAC name: 3-O-Benzyl-N-({3-[(3S,4R,5R)-3-butyl-7-(dimethylamino)-3-ethyl-4-hydroxy-1,1-dioxido-2,3,4,5-tetrahydro-1-benzothiepin-5-yl]phenyl}carbamoyl)-6-O-sulfo-β-D-glucopyranosylamine
- CAS Number: 1025216-57-2
- PubChem CID: 24987688
- ChemSpider: 35099493
- UNII: X2JZ0451H8
- KEGG: D11007
- ChEMBL: ChEMBL3707222
- CompTox Dashboard (EPA): DTXSID001098929

Chemical and physical data
- Formula: C_{38}H_{51}N_{3}O_{12}S_{2}
- Molar mass: 805.96 g·mol^{−1}
- 3D model (JSmol): Interactive image
- SMILES: CCCC[C@]1(CC)CS(=O)(=O)c2ccc(cc2[C@H]([C@H]1O)c3cccc(NC(=O)N[C@@H]4O[C@H](COS(=O)(=O)O)[C@@H](O)[C@H](OCc5ccccc5)[C@H]4O)c3)N(C)C
- InChI: InChI=1S/C38H51N3O12S2/c1-5-7-18-38(6-2)23-54(46,47)30-17-16-27(41(3)4)20-28(30)31(35(38)44)25-14-11-15-26(19-25)39-37(45)40-36-33(43)34(51-21-24-12-9-8-10-13-24)32(42)29(53-36)22-52-55(48,49)50/h8-17,19-20,29,31-36,42-44H,5-7,18,21-23H2,1-4H3,(H2,39,40,45)(H,48,49,50)/t29-,31-,32-,33-,34+,35-,36-,38-/m1/s1; Key:ULVBLFBUTQMAGZ-RTNCXNSASA-N

Volixibat (INN; development code SHP626) is a medication under development as a possible treatment for nonalcoholic steatohepatitis (NASH), the most severe form of non-alcoholic fatty liver disease (NAFLD). No other pharmacotherapy yet exists for NASH, so there is interest in whether volixibat can prove to be both safe and effective. To encourage development and testing, the U.S. Food and Drug Administration (FDA) has issued fast track status.

Volixibat is an IBAT inhibitor, meaning that it blocks the function of the IBAT protein (ileal bile acid transporter), which is also called SLC10A2 (solute carrier family 10 member 2) or ASBT (apical sodium–bile acid transporter). IBAT is most highly expressed in the ileum, where it is found on the brush border membrane of enterocytes. It is responsible for the initial uptake of bile acids, particularly conjugated bile acids, from the intestine as part of their enterohepatic circulation.
