= Hydrocholeretic =

Hydrocholeretics are substances that increase the volume of secretion of bile from the liver without increasing the amount of solids secreted. Some substances can result in decreased solid production, possibly due to circulatory effects.

Cyclobutyrol is a compound commonly used as a hydrocholeretic. Its effects in rats include a dose-dependent increase in bile flow, sodium, potassium, chloride and bicarbonate outputs and reduced bile acid concentrations.

== See also ==
- Cholekinetic
- Choleretic
