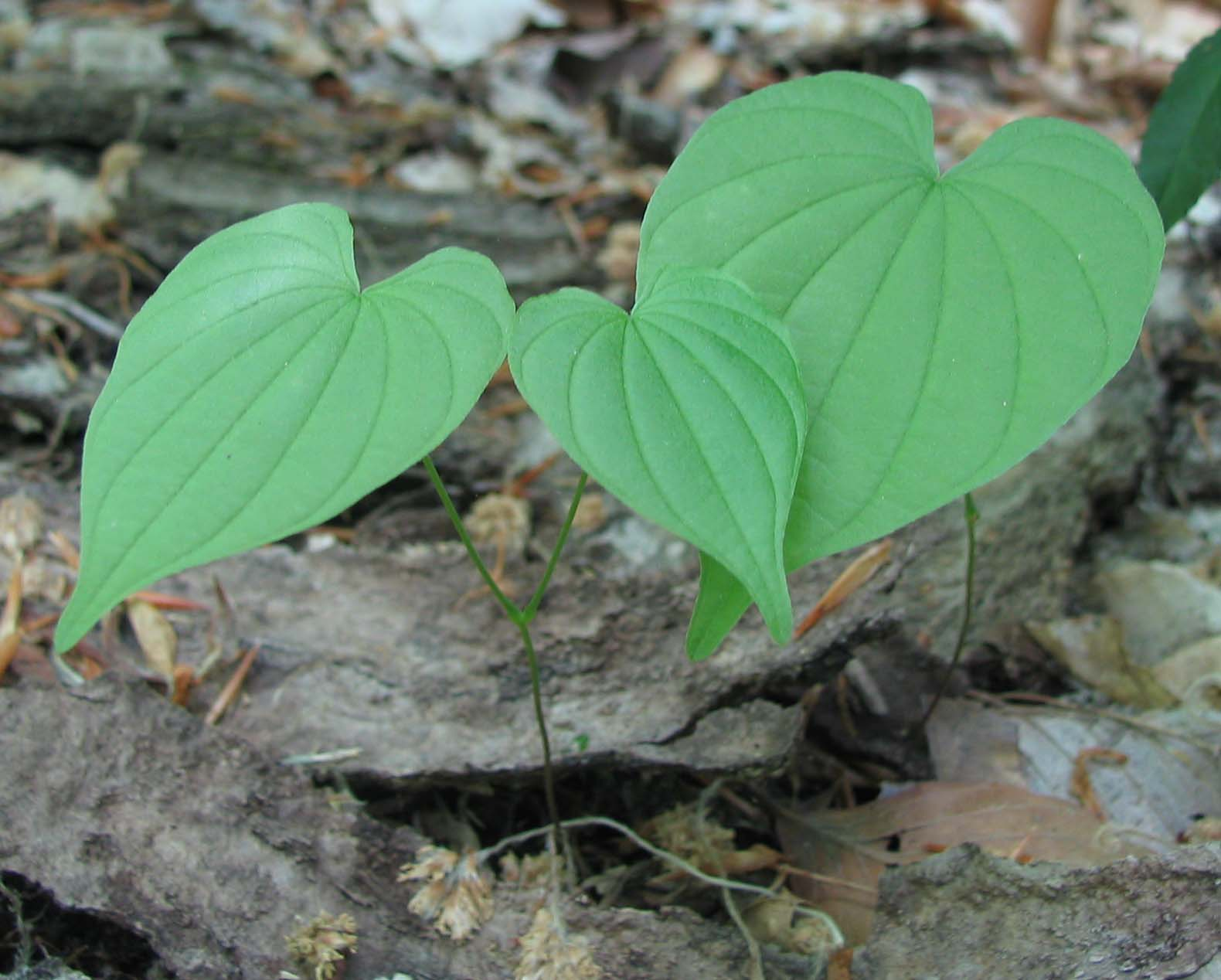

Conservation status
- Least Concern (IUCN 3.1)

- Apparently Secure (NatureServe)

Scientific classification
- Kingdom: Plantae
- Clade: Embryophytes
- Clade: Tracheophytes
- Clade: Spermatophytes
- Clade: Angiosperms
- Clade: Monocots
- Order: Dioscoreales
- Family: Dioscoreaceae
- Genus: Dioscorea
- Species: D. villosa

Binomial name
- Dioscorea villosa L.

Synonyms
- Merione villosa (L.) Salisb.; Dioscorea sativa L.; Dioscorea quaternata Walter; Dioscorea quinata Walter; Dioscorea cliffortiana Lam.; Dioscorea paniculata Michx.; Dioscorea waltheri Desf.; Dioscorea glauca Muhl. ex L.C.Beck; Dioscorea hexaphylla Raf.; Dioscorea longifolia Raf.; Dioscorea megaptera Raf.; Dioscorea repanda Raf.; Dioscorea pruinosa Kunth; Dioscorea hirticaulis Bartlett; Dioscorea lloydiana E.H.L.Krause

= Dioscorea villosa =

Species of yam from North America

Dioscorea villosa is a species of twining tuberous vine which is native to eastern North America. It is commonly known as wild yam, colic root, rheumatism root, devil's bones, and fourleaf yam. It is common and widespread in a range stretching from Texas and Florida north to Minnesota, Ontario and Massachusetts.

== Description ==
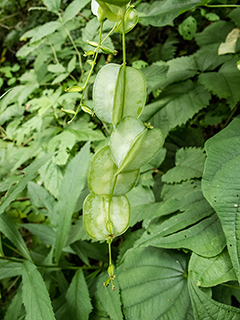
Dioscorea villosa

Dioscorea villosa flower petal color is commonly known to be green to brown, or white. Lengths of the flower petals range from 0.5 to 2 mm (1/32 to 3/32 in). The flowers tend to grow out of the axil; this is the point at which a branch or leaf attaches to the main stem. There is only one flower present on the inflorescence. The fruit of the plant is a capsule that splits and releases the seeds within to then begin the dispersal process The fruit of Dioscorea villosa ranges in size from 10–30 mm (3/8–1 3/16 in). The flower does not produce aerial bulblets. The leaves are heart-shaped, usually a whorl of four at each node, but there can be as many as nine in a whorl.

== Taxonomy ==
Synonyms of Dioscorea villosa include Dioscorea hirticaulis and Dioscorea villosa var. hirticaulis. Common names of Dioscorea villosa include wild yam, Atlantic yam, common wild yam, wild yam-root, yellow yam, colic root, and rheumatism root.

== Chemistry ==
Dioscorea villosa contains diosgenin, which despite claims is not a phytoestrogen and does not interact with estrogen receptors. Other steroidal saponins are also found in the plant.

== Medical use ==
Some of the English common names of this plant reflect its use in Native American and other traditional medicines. Native Americans in the southeast cultivated this plant. In traditional Russian herbal medicine, saponin extracts from the roots of various varieties of wild yam are thought to be an anticoagulant, antisclerotic, antispasmodic, cholagogue, depurative, diaphoretic, diuretic and a vasodilator.

There is little modern clinical research on Dioscorea villosa, and the one study of a wild yam-containing cream for menopausal symptoms failed to find any value from this therapy. According to the American Cancer Society, there is no evidence to support wild yam or diosgenin being either safe or effective in humans.

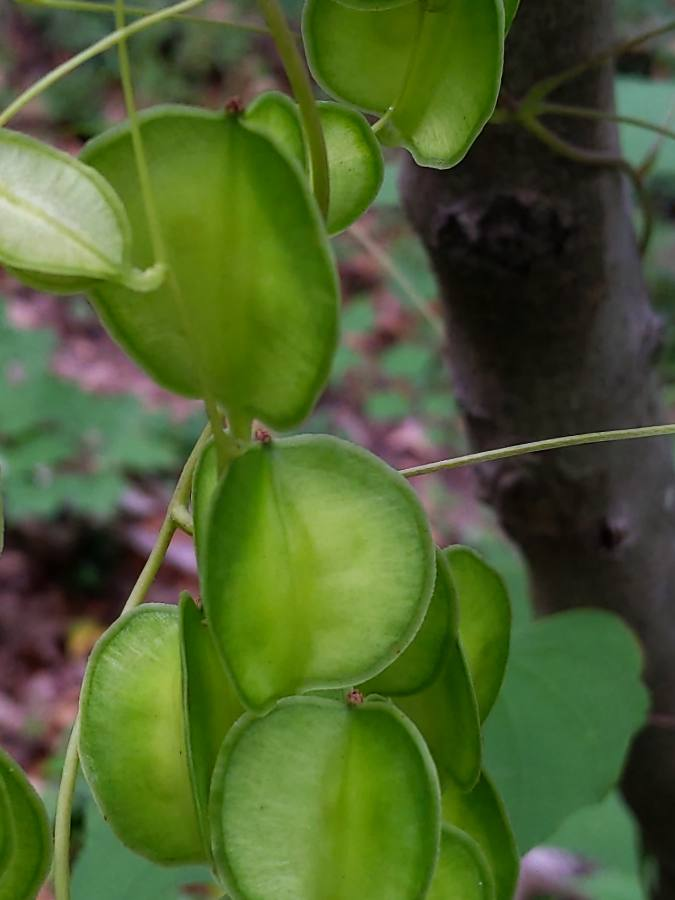
Wild yam seeds

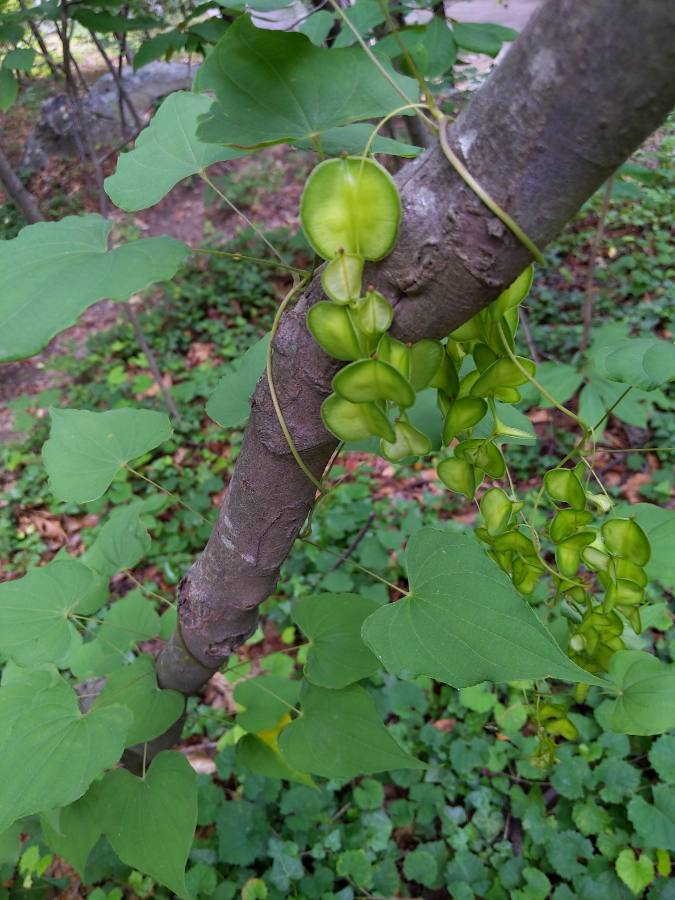
Wild yam vine
