= Linerixibat =

Medication

Clinical data
- Trade names: Lynavoy
- Other names: GSK-2330672
- AHFS/Drugs.com: Monograph
- MedlinePlus: a626054
- License data: US DailyMed: Linerixibat
- Routes of administration: By mouth
- Drug class: Ileal bile acid transporter inhibitor
- ATC code: A05AX08 (WHO)

Legal status
- Legal status: US: ℞-only; EU: Rx-only

Identifiers
- CAS Number: 1345982-69-5
- PubChem CID: 53492727
- DrugBank: DB11729
- ChemSpider: 30825906
- UNII: 386012Z45S
- KEGG: D11539
- ChEMBL: ChEMBL2387408

Chemical and physical data
- Formula: C_{28}H_{38}N_{2}O_{7}S
- Molar mass: 546.68 g·mol^{−1}
- 3D model (JSmol): Interactive image
- SMILES: CCCC[C@@]1(CS(=O)(=O)C2=C(C=C(C(=C2)CNC(CC(=O)O)CC(=O)O)OC)[C@H](N1)C3=CC=CC=C3)CC
- InChI: InChI=1S/C28H38N2O7S/c1-4-6-12-28(5-2)18-38(35,36)24-13-20(17-29-21(14-25(31)32)15-26(33)34)23(37-3)16-22(24)27(30-28)19-10-8-7-9-11-19/h7-11,13,16,21,27,29-30H,4-6,12,14-15,17-18H2,1-3H3,(H,31,32)(H,33,34)/t27-,28-/m1/s1; Key:CZGVOBIGEBDYTP-VSGBNLITSA-N

Linerixibat, sold under the brand name Lynavoy, is a medication used for the treatment of cholestatic pruritus. Linerixibat is an ileal bile acid transporter (IBAT) inhibitor. It is taken by mouth.

The most common side effects are diarrhea, abdominal pain and transaminase elevations.

Linerixibat was approved for medical use in the United States in March 2026.

== Medical uses ==
Linerixibat is indicated for the treatment of cholestatic pruritus associated with primary biliary cholangitis in adults.

== History ==
The benefits of linerixibat were demonstrated in a double-blind, placebo-controlled, multi-center, global phase III study.

== Society and culture ==
=== Legal status ===
Linerixibat was approved for medical use in the United States in March 2026.

In July 2026, the Committee for Medicinal Products for Human Use of the European Medicines Agency adopted a positive opinion, recommending the granting of a marketing authorization for the medicinal product Lynavoy, intended for the treatment of cholestatic pruritus in adults with primary biliary cholangitis. The applicant for this medicinal product is Glaxosmithkline Trading Services Limiteds. Linerixibat was authorized for medical use in the European Union in October 2026.

=== Names ===
Linerixibat is the international nonproprietary name.

Linerixibat is sold under the brand name Lynavoy.
