= Tidiacic =

Chemical compound

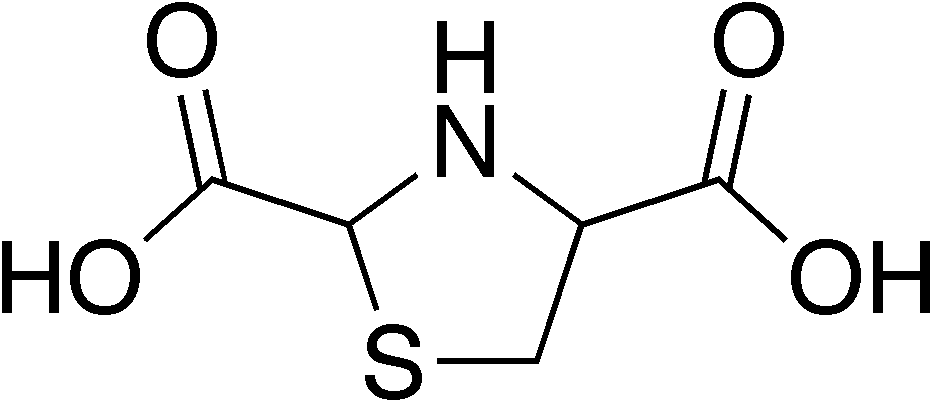

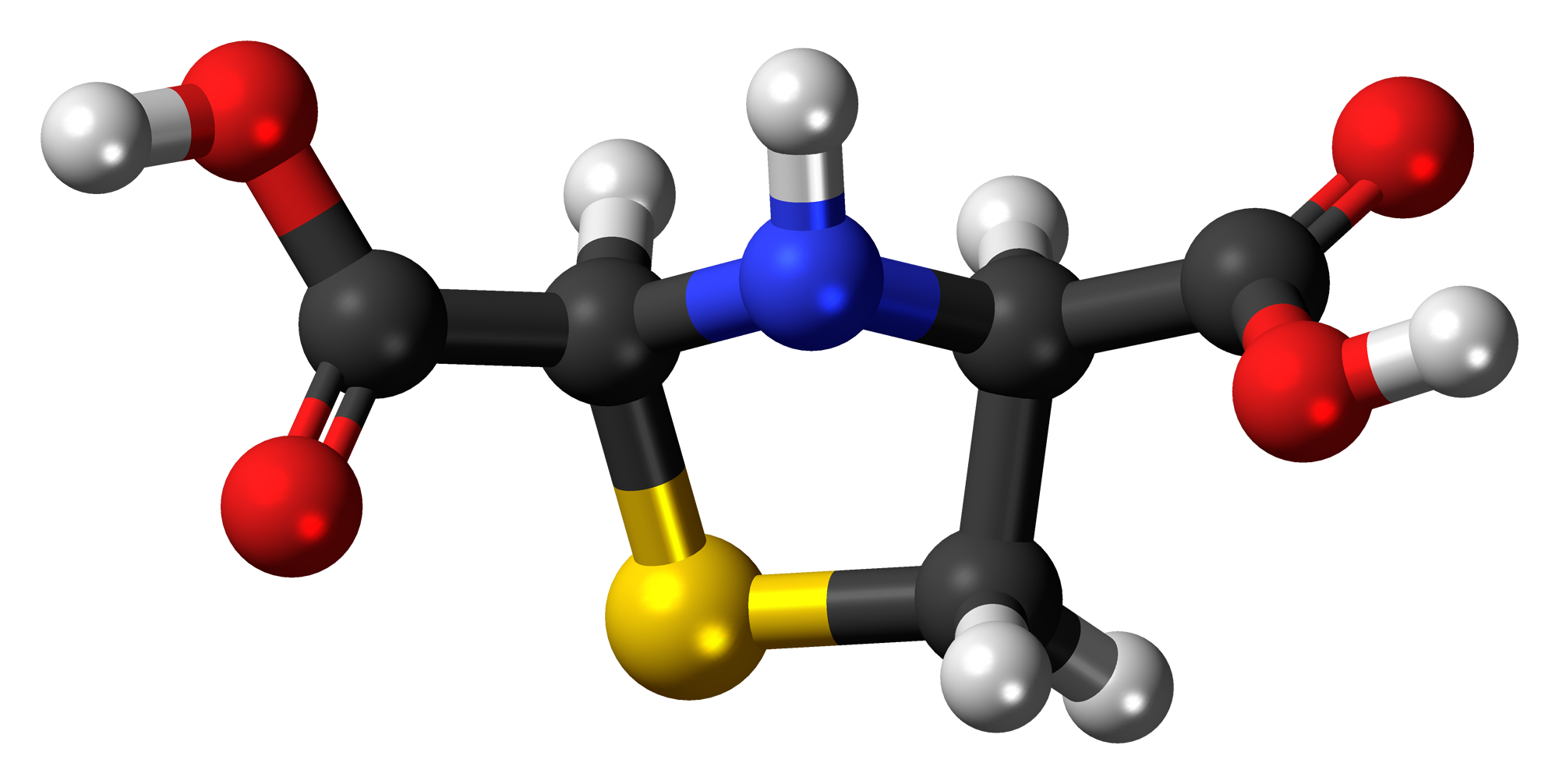

Identifiers
- IUPAC name: Thiazolidine-2,4-dicarboxylic acid
- CAS Number: 30097-06-4
- PubChem CID: 72150
- ChemSpider: 65123
- UNII: F39KSS6R80
- CompTox Dashboard (EPA): DTXSID30865528
- ECHA InfoCard: 100.045.484

Chemical and physical data
- Formula: C_{5}H_{7}NO_{4}S
- Molar mass: 177.17 g·mol^{−1}
- 3D model (JSmol): Interactive image
- SMILES: C1C(NC(S1)C(=O)O)C(=O)O
- InChI: InChI=1S/C5H7NO4S/c7-4(8)2-1-11-3(6-2)5(9)10/h2-3,6H,1H2,(H,7,8)(H,9,10); Key:DAXBISKSIDBYEU-UHFFFAOYSA-N

Tidiacic arginine
Combination of
- Tidiacic: hepatoprotective
- Arginine: amino acid

Clinical data
- Trade names: Tiadilon
- ATC code: A05BA07 (WHO)

Identifiers
- CAS Number: 30986-62-0
- ChemSpider: 142008
- CompTox Dashboard (EPA): DTXSID30865528
- ECHA InfoCard: 100.045.484

Tidiacic is a hepatoprotective drug. It is a component of tidiacic arginine.

Tidiacic arginine (trade name Tiadilon) is a 1:1 combination of the amino acid arginine and tidiacic (thiazolidine-2,4-dicarboxylic acid), which acts as a sulfur donor.

In France, its indications and use have been described as "identical to those of silymarin".
