= ATC code A05 =

ATC code A05 Bile and liver therapy is a therapeutic subgroup of the Anatomical Therapeutic Chemical Classification System, a system of alphanumeric codes developed by the World Health Organization (WHO) for the classification of drugs and other medical products. Subgroup A05 is part of the anatomical group A Alimentary tract and metabolism.

Codes for veterinary use (ATCvet codes) can be created by placing the letter Q in front of the human ATC code: for example, QA05. ATCvet codes without corresponding human ATC codes are cited with the leading Q in the following list.
National versions of the ATC classification may include additional codes not present in this list, which follows the WHO version.

== A05A Bile therapy ==
=== A05AA Bile acids and derivatives ===
A05AA01 Chenodeoxycholic acid
A05AA02 Ursodeoxycholic acid
A05AA03 Cholic acid
A05AA04 Obeticholic acid
A05AA05 Ursodoxicoltaurine
A05AA06 Norucholic acid

=== A05AB Preparations for biliary tract therapy ===
A05AB01 Nicotinyl methylamide

=== A05AX Other drugs for bile therapy ===
A05AX01 Piprozolin
A05AX02 Hymecromone
A05AX03 Cyclobutyrol
A05AX04 Maralixibat chloride
A05AX05 Odevixibat
A05AX06 Elafibranor
A05AX07 Seladelpar
A05AX08 Linerixibat
QA05AX90 Menbutone

== A05B Liver therapy, lipotropics ==
=== A05BA Liver therapy ===
A05BA01 Arginine glutamate
A05BA03 Silymarin
A05BA04 Citiolone
A05BA05 Epomediol
A05BA06 Ornithine oxoglutarate
A05BA07 Tidiacic arginine
A05BA08 Glycyrrhizic acid (glycyrrhizin)
A05BA09 Metadoxine
A05BA10 Phospholipids
A05BA11 Resmetirom
QA05BA90 Methionine

== A05C Drugs for bile therapy and lipotropics in combination ==
Empty group
