= Epomediol =

Synthetic terpenoid

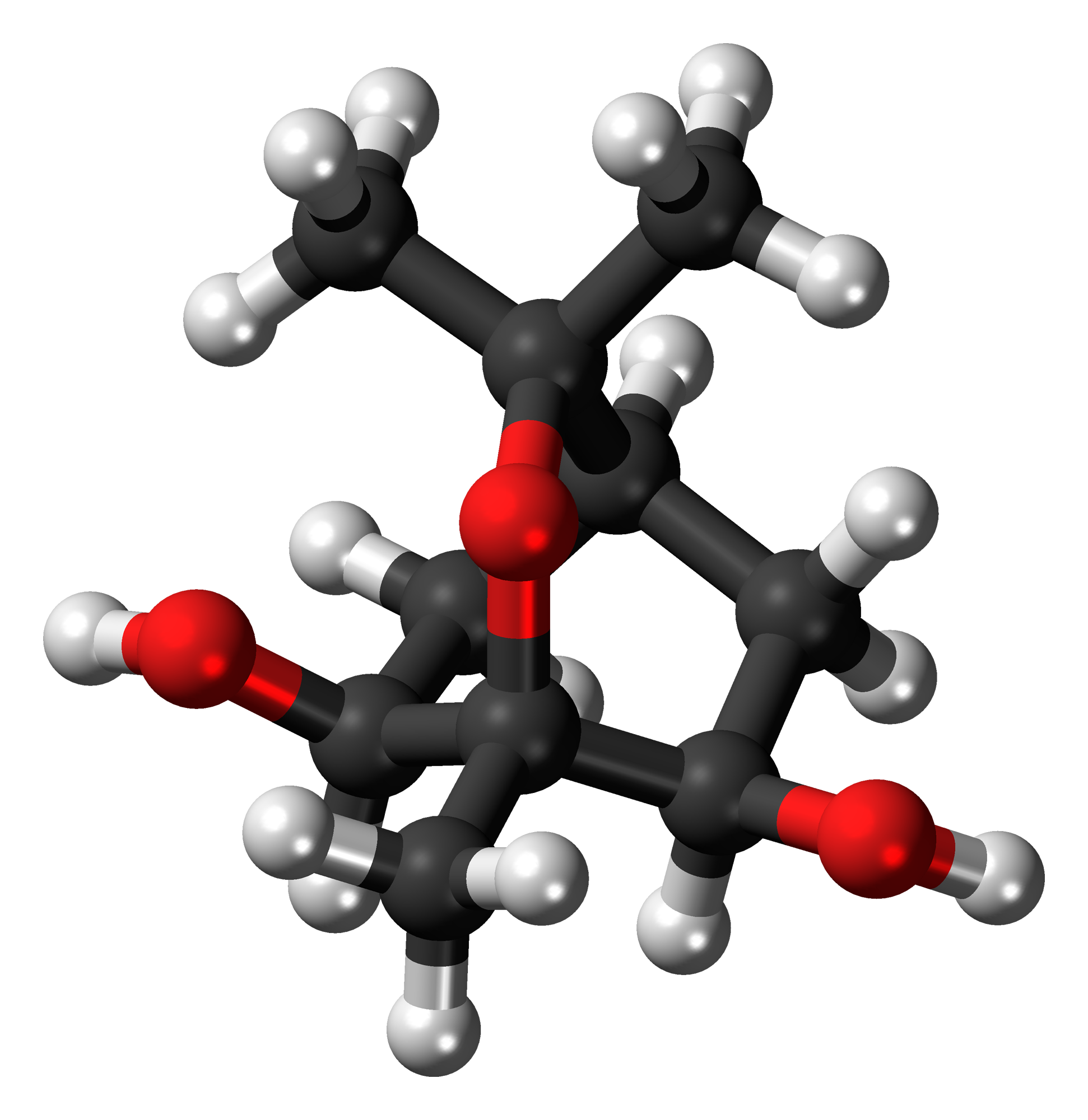

Clinical data
- Other names: 1,3,3-Trimethyl-2-oxabicyclo [2.2.2]octane-6,7-endo,endo-diol
- ATC code: A05BA05 (WHO)

Identifiers
- IUPAC name: (1s,4r,6R,7S)-1,3,3-trimethyl-2-oxabicyclo[2.2.2]octane-6,7-diol
- CAS Number: 56084-15-2
- PubChem CID: 115056
- ChemSpider: 102967
- UNII: KFU4XSK3BK
- CompTox Dashboard (EPA): DTXSID70971470

Chemical and physical data
- Formula: C_{10}H_{18}O_{3}
- Molar mass: 186.251 g·mol^{−1}
- 3D model (JSmol): Interactive image
- SMILES: OC1CC2C(OC1(C)C(O)C2)(C)C

Epomediol (trade name Clesidren) is a synthetic terpenoid with choleretic effects. It has been used in the symptomatic treatment of itching due to intrahepatic cholestasis of pregnancy.
