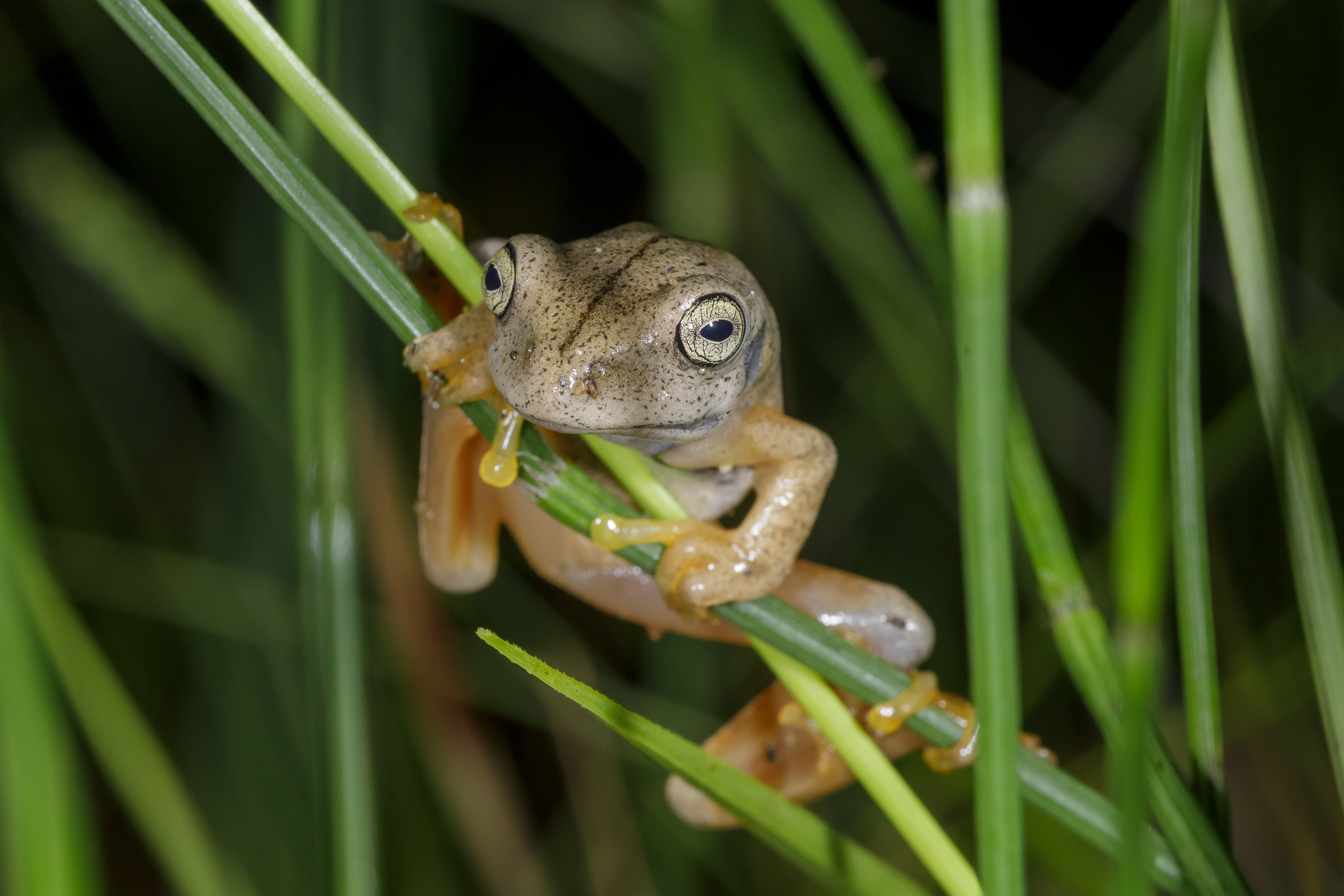

Conservation status
- Least Concern (IUCN 3.1)

Scientific classification
- Kingdom: Animalia
- Phylum: Chordata
- Class: Amphibia
- Order: Anura
- Family: Hylidae
- Genus: Boana
- Species: B. faber

Binomial name
- Boana faber (Wied-Neuwied, 1821)

Synonyms
- Hyla faber Wied-Neuwied, 1821; Hyla wachei Nieden, 1911; Hypsiboas faber (Wied-Neuwied, 1821)

= Blacksmith tree frog =

Species of amphibian

The blacksmith tree frog (Boana faber), or smith frog, is a frog species in the family Hylidae. It is found in eastern to southern Brazil, north-eastern Argentina and south-eastern Paraguay. Its natural habitats are tropical humid forests, including forest edges, at elevations of 150–800 m (490–2,620 ft) above sea level. Breeding takes place in temporary and permanent pools (including artificial pools) and slow-moving streams where the frogs make nests. This is an abundant species throughout its range. Clear cutting of forests remains a threat, whereas the species adapts to selectively logged and second growth forests. It is present in several protected areas. It is not considered threatened by the IUCN.

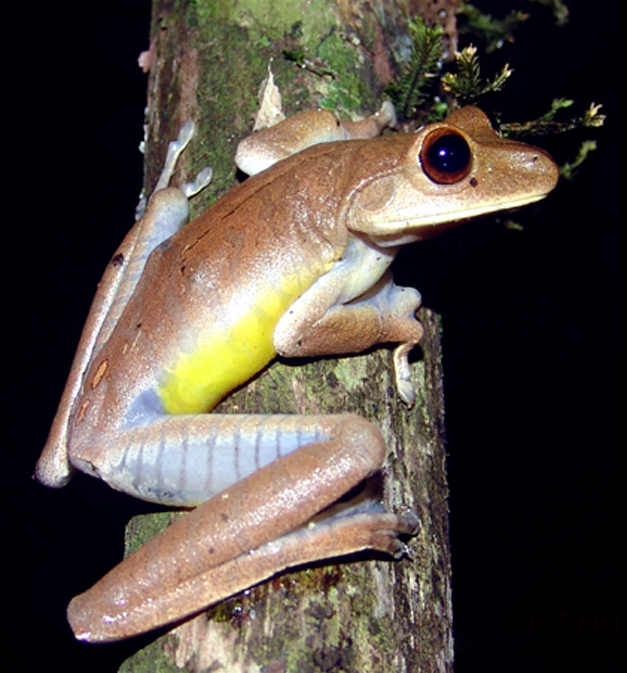

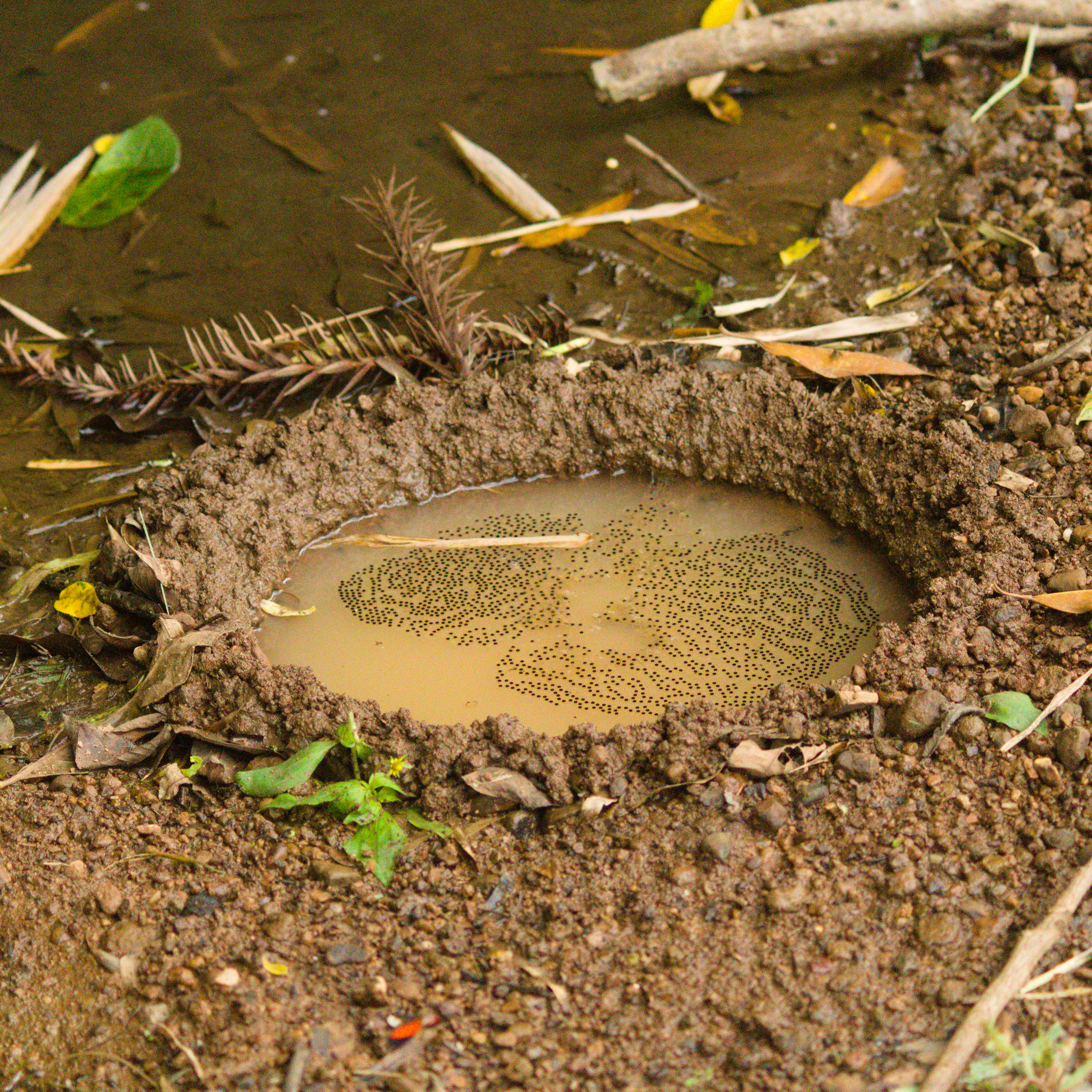
Pool nest in Rio Grande do Sul, Brazil.

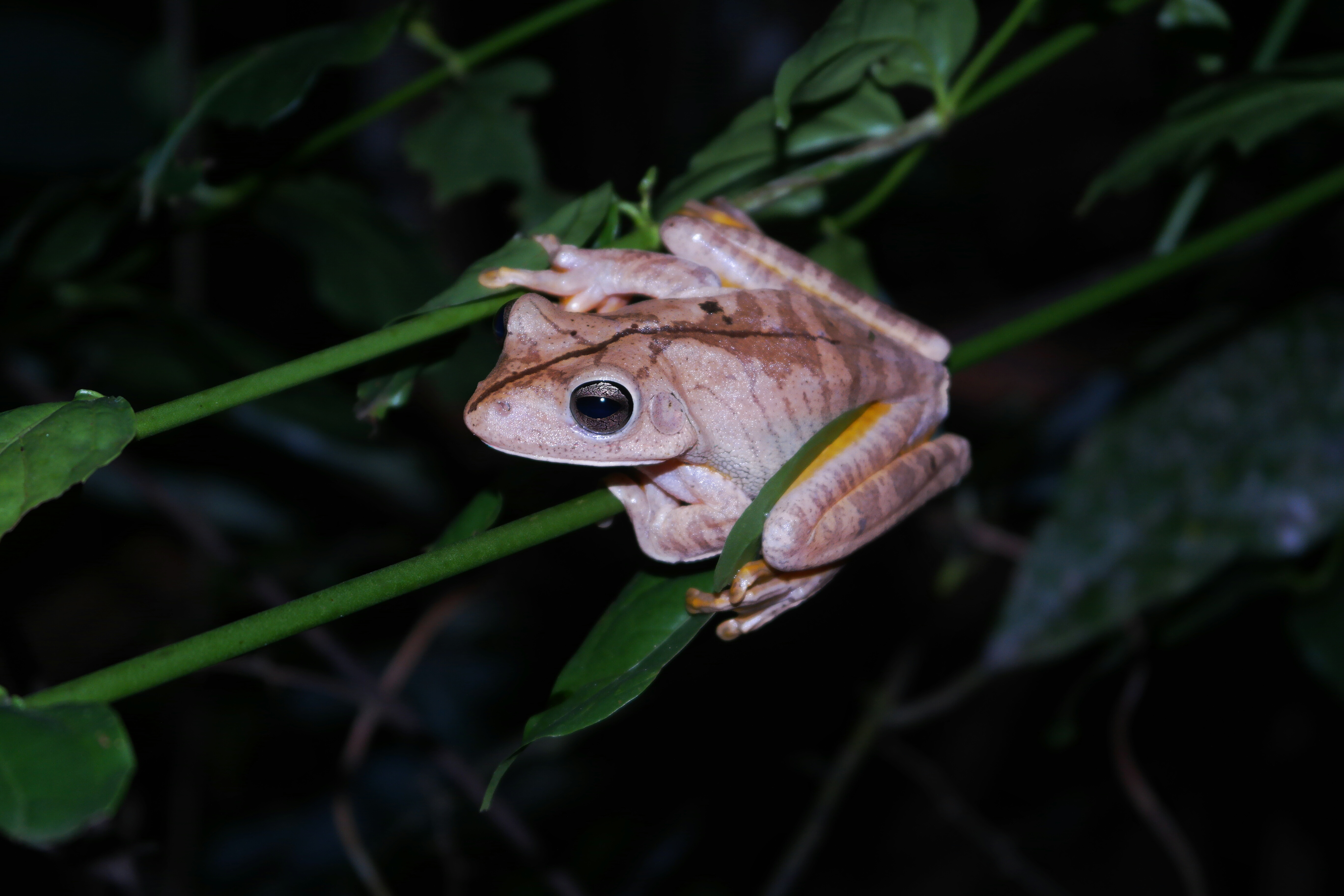

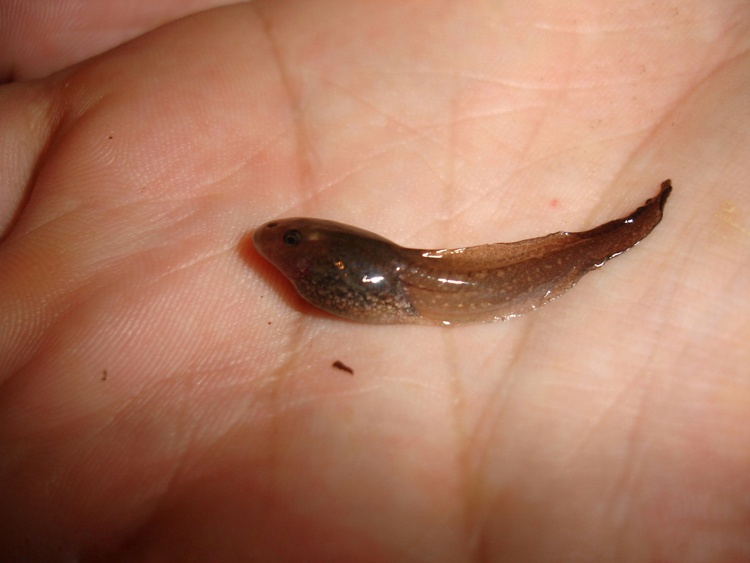
Tadpole
