= Cyclobutyrol =

Chemical compound

Clinical data
- ATC code: A05AX03 (WHO)

Identifiers
- IUPAC name: 2-(1-Hydroxycyclohexyl)butanoic acid
- CAS Number: 512-16-3
- PubChem CID: 72065
- ChemSpider: 65051
- UNII: 8T4L120N6M
- KEGG: D07104
- ChEBI: CHEBI:61024
- ChEMBL: ChEMBL1697739
- CompTox Dashboard (EPA): DTXSID00862084
- ECHA InfoCard: 100.007.399

Chemical and physical data
- Formula: C_{10}H_{18}O_{3}
- Molar mass: 186.251 g·mol^{−1}
- 3D model (JSmol): Interactive image
- SMILES: CCC(C(=O)O)C1(CCCCC1)O
- InChI: InChI=1S/C10H18O3/c1-2-8(9(11)12)10(13)6-4-3-5-7-10/h8,13H,2-7H2,1H3,(H,11,12); Key:NIVFTEMPSCMWDE-UHFFFAOYSA-N

Cyclobutyrol is a drug used in bile therapy. Cyclobutyrol (CB) is a choleretic agent which also inhibits biliary lipids secretion.
