= Cholestatic pruritus =

- Other names: Hepatic pruritus, biliary pruritus
- Specialty: Gastroenterology, dermatology, hepatology

Cholestatic pruritus is the sensation of itch due to nearly any liver disease, but the most commonly associated entities are primary biliary cholangitis, primary sclerosing cholangitis, obstructive choledocholithiasis, carcinoma of the bile duct, cholestasis (also see drug-induced pruritus), and chronic hepatitis C viral infection and other forms of viral hepatitis.

== Cause ==
Cholestasis means "the slowing or stopping of bile flow" which can be caused by any number of diseases of the liver (which produces the bile), the gallbladder (which stores the bile), or biliary tract (also known as the biliary tree, the conduit that allows the bile to leave the liver and gallbladder and enter the small intestine). When this occurs, conjugated bilirubin and the waste products that usually would be cleared in bile reflux back into the bloodstream. This causes a primarily conjugated hyperbilirubinemia and jaundice; the liver conjugates the bile to make it water-soluble and because the bile has already been processed by the liver, when it gets backed up because of a blockage and is refluxed into the blood, the blood will have high levels of conjugated bilirubin. This is in contrast to primarily unconjugated hyperbilirubinemia which is the water-insoluble form that is bound to serum albumin; the liver has not had a chance to conjugate the bilirubin yet and can be caused either because too much unconjugated bilirubin is made (such as in massive hemolysis or ineffective erythropoiesis) or because too little is conjugated (Gilbert's disease or Crigler–Najjar syndrome). Unconjugated hyperbilirubinemia does not typically cause pruritus.

It is thought that bile salts that deposit into the skin are responsible for the pruritus (itching) because the levels of bilirubin in the bloodstream and the severity of the pruritus does not appear to be highly correlated. Patients that have been administered bile salt chelating agents do report some relief, however, and patients that have complete liver cell failure (and therefore cannot make these products to begin with) do not have pruritus. This suggests that products made by the liver must have some role in pruritus although it is not known exactly which product is responsible.

== See also ==
- Intrahepatic cholestasis of pregnancy
- List of cutaneous conditions
- Linerixibat
