= Cholekinetic =

A cholekinetic drug is a pharmaceutical drug which increases the contractile power of the bile duct.

== See also ==
- Choleretic
- Hydrocholeretic
