= Ornithine oxoglutarate =

Chemical compound

- Ornithine (top) and ketoglutaric acid (bottom)

Clinical data
- ATC code: A05BA06 (WHO)

Identifiers
- IUPAC name: 2-Oxopentanedioic acid - L-ornithine (1:1)
- CAS Number: 34414-83-0
- PubChem CID: 78866
- ChemSpider: 71201
- CompTox Dashboard (EPA): DTXSID30958449 DTXSID20187988, DTXSID30958449
- ECHA InfoCard: 100.047.261 100.023.615, 100.047.261

Chemical and physical data
- Formula: C_{10}H_{18}N_{2}O_{7}
- Molar mass: 278.261 g·mol^{−1}
- 3D model (JSmol): Interactive image
- SMILES: C(C[C@@H](C(=O)O)N)CN.C(CC(=O)O)C(=O)C(=O)O
- InChI: InChI=1S/C5H12N2O2.C5H6O5/c6-3-1-2-4(7)5(8)9;6-3(5(9)10)1-2-4(7)8/h4H,1-3,6-7H2,(H,8,9);1-2H2,(H,7,8)(H,9,10)/t4-;/m0./s1; Key:SLPUVFBNQHVEEU-WCCKRBBISA-N

Ornithine oxoglutarate (OGO) or ornithine α-ketoglutarate (OKG) is a drug used in liver therapy. It is the salt formed from ornithine and alpha-ketoglutaric acid. It is also used to improve nutritional health in elderly patients.
