= Ileal sodium/bile acid cotransporter =

Protein-coding gene in the species Homo sapiens

SLC10A2

Identifiers
- Aliases: SLC10A2, ASBT, IBAT, ISBT, NTCP2, PBAM, solute carrier family 10 member 2, Ileal bile acid transporter, PBAM1
- External IDs: OMIM: 601295; MGI: 1201406; GeneCards: SLC10A2

Gene location (Human)
Chr.	Chromosome 13 (human)
Band	13q33.1	Start	103,043,998 bp
Band	13q33.1	End	103,066,417 bp

Gene location (Mouse)
Chr.	Chromosome 8 (mouse)
Band	8 A1.1|8 2.16 cM	Start	5,133,219 bp
Band	8 A1.1|8 2.16 cM	End	5,155,351 bp
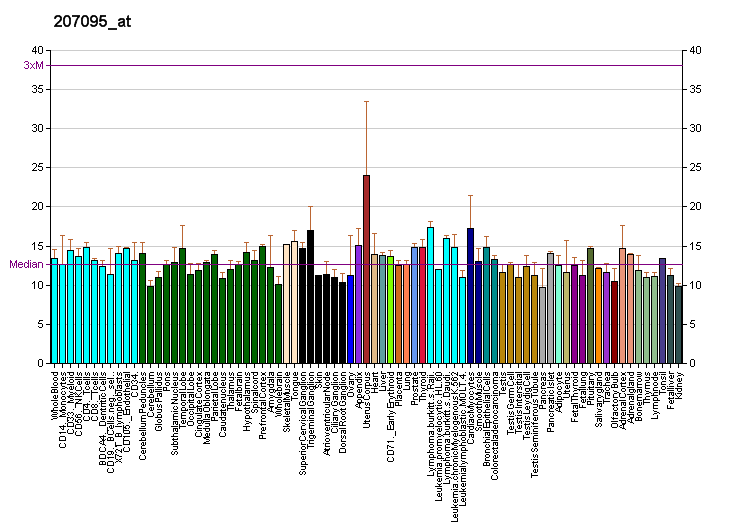
RNA expression pattern
Bgee	Human / Mouse (ortholog); Top expressed in: mucosa of ileum; jejunal mucosa; duodenum; kidney tubule; testicle; glomerulus; metanephric glomerulus; human kidney; gallbladder; gonad / Top expressed in: proximal tubule; human kidney; right kidney; ileum; Paneth cell; lumbar spinal ganglion; left lobe of liver; lumbar subsegment of spinal cord; intestinal villus; jejunum; More reference expression data
BioGPS	More reference expression data
Gene ontology
Molecular function	symporter activity; bile acid:sodium symporter activity
Cellular component	integral component of membrane; microvillus; plasma membrane; integral component of plasma membrane; apical plasma membrane; membrane
Biological process	ion transport; transmembrane transport; bile acid and bile salt transport; sodium ion transport; response to bacterium
Sources:Amigo / QuickGO
Orthologs
Databases	NCBI: entry; OMA: entry
Species	Human	Mouse
Entrez	6555	20494
Ensembl	ENSG00000125255	ENSMUSG00000023073
UniProt	Q12908	P70172
RefSeq (mRNA)	NM_000452	NM_011388
RefSeq (protein)	NP_000443	NP_035518
Location (UCSC)	Chr 13: 103.04 – 103.07 Mb	Chr 8: 5.13 – 5.16 Mb
PubMed search
- Wikidata
View/Edit Human	View/Edit Mouse

Ileal sodium/bile acid cotransporter, also known as apical sodium–bile acid transporter (ASBT) and ileal bile acid transporter (IBAT), is a bile acid:sodium symporter protein that in humans is encoded by the SLC10A2 gene.

ASBT/IBAT is most highly expressed in the ileum, where it is found on the brush border membrane of enterocytes. It is responsible for the initial uptake of bile acids, particularly conjugated bile acids, from the intestine as part of their enterohepatic circulation.

== As a drug target ==
Several medications to inhibit IBAT are under development. They include elobixibat, under development for the treatment of constipation and irritable bowel syndrome, and volixibat, under development for the treatment of nonalcoholic steatohepatitis.

- Elobixibat
- Linerixibat
- Maralixibat
- Odevixibat
- Ritivixibat
- Volixibat

== See also ==
- Solute carrier family
