= Hepatitis D =

Human infectious disease

- Other names: Hepatitis delta, Deltavirus
- Specialty: Gastroenterology, infectious disease
- Symptoms: Feeling tired, nausea and vomiting
- Complications: Cirrhosis
- Causes: Hepatitis D virus
- Diagnostic method: Immunoglobulin G
- Treatment: Antivirals, pegylated interferon alpha
- Medication: Bulevirtide
- Frequency: 0.03%

Hepatitis D a form of viral hepatitis caused by the infection with the hepatitis delta virus (HDV). HDV is one of five known hepatitis viruses: A, B, C, D, and E. HDV is considered to be a satellite (a type of subviral agent) because it can propagate only in the presence of the hepatitis B virus (HBV). Transmission of HDV can occur either via simultaneous infection with HBV (coinfection) or superimposed on chronic hepatitis B or hepatitis B carrier state (superinfection).

HDV infecting a person with chronic hepatitis B (superinfection) is considered the most serious type of viral hepatitis due to its severity of complications. These complications include a greater likelihood of experiencing liver failure in acute infections and a rapid progression to liver cirrhosis, with an increased risk of developing liver cancer in chronic infections. In combination with hepatitis B virus, hepatitis D has the highest fatality rate of all the hepatitis infections, at 20%. A recent estimate from 2020 suggests that currently 48 million people are infected with this virus.

== Virology ==
Hepatitis delta virus
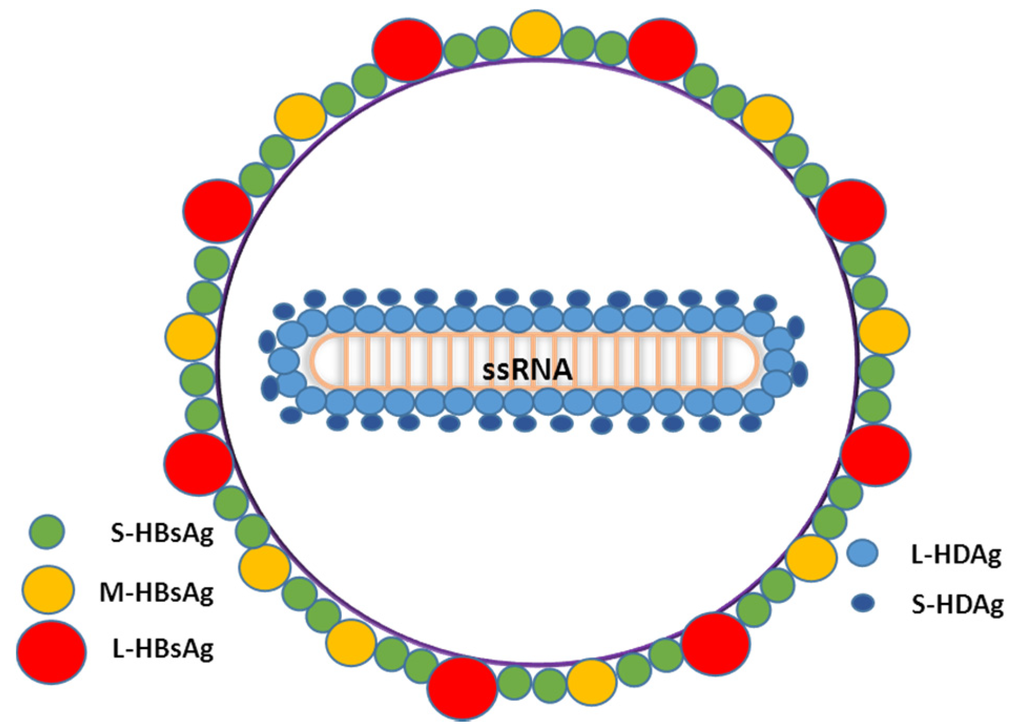
- Schematic representation of the Hepatitis delta virus virion

Virus classification
- (unranked): Virus
- Realm: Ribozyviria
- Family: Kolmioviridae
- Genus: Deltavirus

Species
- Deltavirus cameroonense [HDV-7]; Deltavirus carense [HDV-6]; Deltavirus italiense [HDV-1]; Deltavirus japanense [HDV-2]; Deltavirus peruense [HDV-3]; Deltavirus senegalense [HDV-8]; Deltavirus taiwanense [HDV-4]; Deltavirus togense [HDV-5]

=== Structure and genome ===
The hepatitis delta viruses, or HDV, are eight species of negative-sense single-stranded RNA viruses (or virus-like particles) classified together as the genus Deltavirus, within the realm Ribozyviria. The HDV virion is a small, spherical, enveloped particle with a 36 nm diameter; its viral envelope contains host phospholipids, as well as three proteins taken from the hepatitis B virus—the large, medium, and small hepatitis B surface antigens. This assembly surrounds an inner ribonucleoprotein (RNP) particle, which contains the genome surrounded by about 200 molecules of hepatitis D antigen (HDAg) for each genome. The HDAg is a viral protein, and it interacts with HDV RNA to help regulate viral replication as well as particle formation. Different regions of HDAg enable its binding to viral RNA and its interactions with other proteins involved in the HDV life cycle HDV is known to have tropism for human liver cells (hepatocytes).

The HDV genome is negative sense, single-stranded, closed circular RNA; with a genome of approximately 1700 nucleotides, HDV is the smallest "virus" known to infect animals. It has been proposed that HDV may have originated from a class of plant pathogens called viroids, which are much smaller than viruses. Its genome is unique among animal viruses because of its high GC nucleotide content. Its nucleotide sequence is about 70% self-complementary, allowing the genome to form a partially double-stranded, rod-like RNA structure. HDV strains are highly divergent; fusions of different strains exist and sequences had been deposited in public databases employing different start sites for the circular viral RNA involved. This had resulted in disagreement with respect to molecular classification of this virus, a situation which has been resolved with the adoption of a proposed reference genome and a uniform classification system.

=== Life cycle ===
Like hepatitis B, HDV gains entry into liver cells via the sodium taurocholate cotransporting polypeptide (NTCP) bile transporter. HDV recognizes its receptor via the N-terminal domain of the large hepatitis B surface antigen, HBsAg. Mapping by mutagenesis of this domain has shown that amino acid residues 9–15 make up the receptor-binding site. After entering the hepatocyte, the virus is uncoated and the nucleocapsid translocated to the nucleus due to a signal in HDAg. Since HDV lacks an RNA polymerase enzyme to synthesize its RNA, it must depend on the enzymes and proteins of the host cell to replicate its RNA. The S-HDAg plays a role in the replication of viral RNA and is involved in regulation of viral RNA synthesis.

The RNA polymerases treat the RNA genome as double-stranded DNA due to the folded rod-like structure it is in. Three forms of RNA are made; circular genomic RNA, circular complementary antigenomic RNA, and a linear polyadenylated antigenomic RNA, which is the mRNA containing the open reading frame for the HDAg. Synthesis of antigenomic RNA occurs in the nucleolus, mediated by RNA polymerase I, whereas synthesis of genomic RNA takes place in the nucleoplasm, mediated by RNA polymerase II. HDV RNA is synthesized first as linear RNA that contains many copies of the genome. The genomic and antigenomic RNA contain a sequence of 85 nucleotides, the hepatitis delta virus ribozyme, that acts as a ribozyme, which self-cleaves the linear RNA into monomers. These monomers are then ligated to form circular RNA. There are two forms of HDAg (large-HDAg and small-HDAg), and they serve different functions during the viral replication process. S-HDAg participates in replication of HDV RNA, whereas L-HDAg blocks the replication process and is required for the production of infectious viral particles.

=== Delta antigens ===
Hepatitis delta virus delta antigen
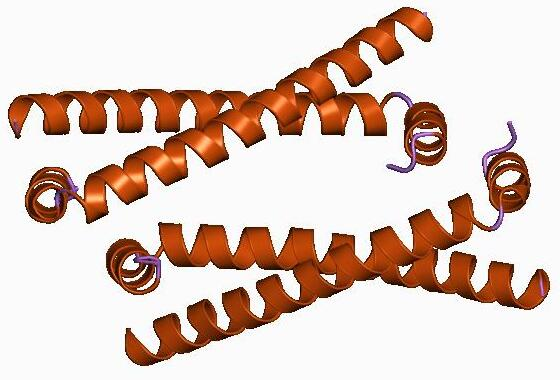
- oligomerization domain of hepatitis delta antigen

Identifiers
- Symbol: HDV_ag
- Pfam: PF01517
- InterPro: IPR002506
- SCOP2: 1a92 / SCOPe / SUPFAM
Available protein structures:
- PDB: IPR002506 PF01517 (ECOD; PDBsum)
- AlphaFold: IPR002506; PF01517

A significant difference between viroids and HDV is that, while viroids produce no proteins, HDV is known to produce HDAg, either as the 27 kDa large-HDAg, or as the small-HDAg of 24 kDa. The N-terminals of the two forms are identical, they differ by 19 more amino acids in the C-terminal of the large HDAg. Both isoforms are produced from the same reading frame which contains an UAG stop codon at codon 196, which normally produces only the small-HDAg. However, editing by cellular enzyme adenosine deaminase acting on RNA (ADAR) changes the stop codon to UGG, allowing the large-HDAg to be produced. Despite having 90% identical sequences, these two proteins play diverging roles during the course of an infection. HDAg-S is produced in the early stages of an infection and enters the nucleus and supports viral replication. HDAg-L, in contrast, is produced during the later stages of an infection, acts as an inhibitor of viral replication, and is required for assembly of viral particles. Thus RNA editing by the cellular enzymes is critical to the virus' life cycle because it regulates the balance between viral replication and virion assembly.

The L-HDAg possesses a cysteine residue near the C-terminal domain that is farnesylated through a process where a lipid molecule is attached via the action of an enzyme in the host cell. This action facilitates the interaction of L-HDAg with S-HBsAg, an essential component of viral particle assembly and release.

=== Antigenic loop infectivity ===
The HDV envelope protein has three of the HBV surface proteins anchored to it. The S region of the genome is most commonly expressed and its main function is to assemble subviral particles. HDV antigen proteins combine with the viral genome to form a ribonucleoprotein (RNP) which when enveloped with the subviral particles can form viral-like particles that are almost identical to mature HDV, but they are not infectious. Researchers had concluded that the determinant of infectivity of HDV was within the N-terminal pre-S1 domain of the large protein (L). It was found to be a mediator in binding to the cellular receptor. Researchers Georges Abou Jaoudé and Camille Sureau published an article in 2005 that studied the role of the antigenic loop, found in HDV envelope proteins, in the infectivity of the virus. The antigenic loop, like the N-terminal pre-S1 domain of the large protein, is exposed at the virion surface. Jaoudé and Sureau's study provided evidence that the antigenic loop may be an important factor in HDV entry into the host cell and by mutating parts of the antigenic loop, the infectivity of HDV may be minimized.

=== Virology in Sjögren's disease ===
HDV is known to infect tissue outside of the liver in the salivary glands of people with Sjögren's disease, an autoimmune disease affecting exocrine glands, without the presence of HBV. It is possible that it does this by relying on the herpes simplex virus (HSV) as a trojan horse to facilitate entry into new host cells, causing a superinfection of HDV and HSV. This phenomenon is poorly studied, but something similar is known to occur in the wild in SDeV, a strain of Deltavirus infecting neural tissue of snakes, entering new cells by hitchhiking within arenaviruses.

== Transmission ==
The routes of transmission of hepatitis D are similar to those for hepatitis B. Infection is largely restricted to persons at high risk of hepatitis B infection, particularly injecting drug users and persons receiving clotting factor concentrates. Worldwide more than 15 million people are co-infected. HDV is rare in most developed countries, and is mostly associated with intravenous drug use. However, HDV is much more common in the immediate Mediterranean region, sub-Saharan Africa, the Middle East, and the northern part of South America. In all, about 20 million people may be infected with HDV.

The Hepatitis D Virus (HDV), is primarily spread through coming into contact with infected blood and/or other bodily fluids. Needle or syringe sharing between individuals, as well as sexual intercourse with an infected person, are common circumstances in which HDV is transmitted. In fact, coming into contact with sharp instruments that have been used on an infected individual can result in HDV transmission due to potential residual traces of their fluid material. HDV can be a co-infection, where both HDV and HBV (hepatitis B virus) infections are simultaneously acquired, or a super infection, where HDV infection occurs after chronic HBV infection.

== People at risk ==
People with chronic infections of hepatitis B virus (HBV) have the potential for contracting hepatitis D virus (HDV) infection by superinfection. There are other groups vulnerable to infection transmission due to other factors such as injection drug users, hemodialysis patients, and the sexual partners of people who have the HDV infection.

Household contacts of infected people, as well as healthcare workers, can also face a higher risk from exposure to HDV infected blood.

== Prevention ==
There is currently no hepatitis D-specific vaccination. Vaccination against hepatitis B protects against hepatitis D viral infection as hepatitis D requires hepatitis B viral infection to be present in order to infect and replicate in people. Universal vaccination against hepatitis B virus is recommended by the World Health Organization. The hepatitis B vaccine is routinely given soon after birth (usually within 24 hours) to protect against hepatitis B and D viral infection.

Latex or polyurethane condoms have been shown to prevent the transmission of hepatitis B, and most likely hepatitis D viral infection.

Women who are pregnant or trying to become pregnant should undergo testing for HBV to know if they carry the virus, this will allow prevention strategies to be implemented during the birth of the child. The CDC recommends that all women who are pregnant be tested for hepatitis B viral infection and that all infants of women with HBV infection be given hepatitis B immune globulin (HBIG) and the hepatitis B vaccine within 12 hours of birth to prevent transmission of the virus from mother to child.

Those who get tattoos or body piercings should do so using sterile equipment to prevent the transmission of hepatitis B and D via infected bodily fluids. Hepatitis B and D can also be transmitted from contaminated needles, so those who inject drugs should seek help to stop drug use or use sterile needles and avoid sharing needles with others. Those with hepatitis B or D should also not share razors or other personal care items which may have been contaminated by potentially infectious bodily fluids.

== Diagnosis ==
Screening for hepatitis D requires testing for anti-HDV antibodies, which indicate past exposure to the virus or current infection. If anti-HDV antibodies are present, then active HDV infection is confirmed through nucleic acid testing for hepatitis D RNA. Testing for HDV is only indicated in those who are hepatitis B surface antigen positive (HBsAg-positive — those who have had previous or active infection with hepatitis B) as HDV requires hepatitis B viral infection to infect people. Testing may be prioritized for individuals born in HDV-endemic regions, those with advanced liver disease, those receiving HBV treatment, and those with increased risk of HDV infection for various reasons. Reflex testing could improve the diagnosis of hepatitis D because it would automatically test for anti-HDV antibodies if there was a HBsAg-positive result first. If the anti-HDV antibody test was positive, HDV RNA testing would be performed as well. This would reduce turnaround time to hepatitis D diagnosis and missed hepatitis D diagnoses.

Non-invasive measures of liver fibrosis, such as the biomarker based FibroTest or non-invasive liver imaging such as transient elastography (also known as the FibroScan) can be used to check for liver fibrosis in patients with chronic HDV. Non-invasive measures are valid, but they can be less accurate because liver inflammation can affect the results. A liver biopsy is sometimes used if the non-invasive test is inconclusive.

== Treatment ==
Current established treatments for chronic hepatitis D include conventional or pegylated interferon alpha therapy and Hepcludex (bulevirtide-gmod) injection.

Evidence suggests that pegylated interferon alpha is effective in reducing the viral load and the effect of the disease during the time the drug is given, but the benefit generally stops if the drug is discontinued. The efficiency of this treatment does not usually exceed about 20%, and late relapse after therapy has been reported.

On May 22, 2026, the U.S. Food and Drug Administration (FDA) approved Hepcludex (bulevirtide-gmod) as the first specific treatment for chronic hepatitis delta virus (HDV) infection in adults with or without compensated cirrhosis. Bulevirtide binds and inactivates the sodium/bile acid cotransporter, blocking hepatitis D virus (as well as hepatitis B virus) from entering hepatocytes. In people with HDV-related compensated cirrhosis and clinically significant portal hypertension, the treatment with (bulevirtide) was safe, well tolerated and has led to a significant improvement in biochemical variables and an increase in liver function parameters.

Bulevirtide may be given with pegylated interferon alpha as the two are thought to have a synergistic effect, leading to greater treatment response rates. A 2024 phase 3 trial tested the effectiveness of both treatments and the combination of the two. There were 3 groups of patients: those who received only peginterferon, those who received only bulevirtide, and those who received a combination of the two. After 48 weeks, they were tested for HDV RNA. It was undetectable in 25% of the peginterferon group, 12% of the bulevirtide group, and 46% of the combination group, proving the superiority of the combination of the two therapies.

Other treatments for hepatitis D which are currently under development include pegylated interferon lambda (λ), which binds to receptors on the hepatocyte surface leading to an intracellular signaling cascade via the JAK-STAT signaling pathway and activation of anti-viral cell mediated immunity. The prenylation inhibitor lonafarnib prevents hepatitis D viral particle assembly by inhibiting the farnesylation of the L-HDAg. REP2139-Ca is a nucleic acid polymer that prevents the release of hepatitis B surface antigen (which is required for assembly of hepatitis D viral particles).

== Prognosis ==
Superinfections, in which hepatitis D viral infection occurs in someone who has chronic hepatitis B (as opposed to co-infection, in which a person is infected with hepatitis B and D simultaneously), are more likely to progress to chronic hepatitis D and are associated with a worse prognosis. 90% of cases of chronic hepatitis D infection are thought to be due to superinfection in those already with hepatitis B. Hepatitis B and D co-infection is likely to lead to acute hepatitis, but is usually self limited with regards to the hepatitis D infection. Infection with both viruses is characterized by a poor prognosis with a much faster liver disease progression. As such, HDV has recently been classified as carcinogenic to humans, just like hepatitis B (and C). Persistent HDV viremia is the most important risk factor for disease progression in those with co-infection or superinfection. Other factors that are responsible for a poor prognosis in chronic hepatitis D include male sex, older age at time of infection, alcohol use, diabetes, obesity and immunodeficiency.

== Epidemiology ==
Worldwide prevalence of HDV among HBV carriers in 2015. Eight genotypes have been identified worldwide by comparative phylogenetic analysis. Genotype 1 is the most frequent and has variable pathogenicity, Genotypes 2 and 4 are found in East Asia causing relatively mild disease. Genotype 3 is found in South America in association with severe hepatitis. Genotypes 5, 6, 7, 8 have been found only in Africa.

HDV is prevalent worldwide, however this prevalence is not uniform across the globe.The prevalence is decreasing in many higher income countries due to hepatitis B vaccination programs (although rates remain high in some groups such as those who inject drugs or immigrants from HDV endemic regions). Infection with HDV is a major medical scourge in low income regions of the globe in which HBV prevalence remains high. Currently the Amazon basin and low income regions of Asia and Africa have high rates of HDV, owing to concurrently high rates of HBV. Globally, five percent of those with chronic hepatitis B infection also have hepatitis D and 12.5% of people with HIV are also co-infected with hepatitis D. HDV also shows to be very apparent in areas with high occurrence for the transmission and contraction of blood borne pathogens.

== History ==
Hepatitis D virus was first reported in 1977 as a nuclear antigen in people infected with HBV who had severe liver disease. This nuclear antigen was then thought to be a hepatitis B antigen and was called the delta antigen. During this time, there was little known about it as it was unexpected and unexplained. Subsequent experiments in chimpanzees showed that the hepatitis delta antigen (HDAg) was a structural part of a pathogen that required HBV infection to produce a complete viral particle. The entire genome was cloned and sequenced in 1986. It was subsequently placed in its own genus: Deltavirus. As a whole, the process of discovering Hepatits D was a discrepancy in diagnostics, as there was little to be known about the virus at the time. Before this, the Hepatitis B virus was the first strain to be discovered in 1967, the Hepatitis A virus being discovered in 1973, Hepatitis D being discovered in 1977, and Hepatitis C being the last to be discovered in 1989.

=== Lábrea fever ===
Lábrea fever
- Other names: Lábrea's black fever, Lábrea hepatitis, Santa Marta fever
- Specialty: Infectious disease
- Usual onset: sudden
- Duration: approx. 1 week
- Prevention: HBV vaccination
- Prognosis: death
- Frequency: 0.03%

Lábrea fever is a lethal tropical infection discovered in the 1950s in the city of Lábrea, in the Brazilian Amazon basin, where it occurs mostly in the area south of the Amazon River, in the states of Acre, Amazonas, and Rondônia. The disease has also been diagnosed in Colombia and Peru. It is now known to be a coinfection or superinfection of hepatitis B (HBV) with hepatitis D.

Lábrea fever has a sudden onset, with jaundice (yellowing of the skin), anorexia (lack of appetite), hematemesis (vomiting of blood), headache, fever and severe prostration. Death occurs by acute liver failure (ALF). In the last phase, neurological symptoms such as agitation, delirium, convulsions and hemorrhagic coma commonly appear. These symptoms arise from a fulminant hepatitis which may kill in less than a week, and which characteristically affects children and young adults, and more males than females. It is accompanied also by an encephalitis in many cases. The disease is highly lethal: in a study carried out in 1986 at Boca do Acre, also in the Amazon, 39 people out of 44 died in the acute phase of the disease. Survivors may develop chronic disease.

The main discovery of delta virus and HBV association was done by Gilberta Bensabath, of the Instituto Evandro Chagas, of Belém, state of Pará, and her collaborators.

Infected people show extensive destruction of liver tissue, with steatosis of a particular type (microsteatosis, characterized by small fat droplets inside the cells), and infiltration of large numbers of inflammatory cells called morula cells, comprised mainly by macrophages containing delta virus antigens.

In the 1987 Boca do Acre study, scientists did an epidemiological survey and reported delta virus infection in 24% of asymptomatic HBV carriers, 29% of acute nonfulminant hepatitis B cases, 74% of fulminant hepatitis B cases, and 100% of chronic hepatitis B cases. The delta virus seems to be endemic in the Amazon region.

== Evolution ==
Three genotypes (I–III) were originally described. Genotype I has been isolated in Europe, North America, Africa and some Asia. This is the most common genotype of the virus and it varies in clinical severity. Genotype II has been found in Japan, Taiwan, and Yakutia (Russia). This genotype is associated with slower disease progression in comparison to other forms. Genotype III has been found exclusively in South America (Peru, Colombia, and Venezuela). This genotype has show to be one of the most aggressive strains, as it can cause sudden and severe liver failure in the individuals it infects. Some genomes from Taiwan and the Okinawa islands have been difficult to type but have been placed in genotype 2. However it is now known that there are at least 8 genotypes of this virus (HDV-1 to HDV-8). Phylogenetic studies suggest an African origin for this pathogen.

An analysis of 36 strains of genotype 3 estimated that the most recent common ancestor of these strains originated around 1930. This genotype spread exponentially from early 1950s to the 1970s in South America. The substitution rate was estimated to be 1.07×10^{−3} substitutions per site per year. Another study found an overall evolution rate of 3.18×10^{−3} substitutions per site per year. The mutation rate varied with position : the hypervariable region evolved faster (4.55×10^{−3} substitutions per site per year) than the hepatitis delta antigen coding region (2.60×10^{−3} substitutions per site per year) and the autocatalytic region (1.11×10^{−3} substitutions per site per year). A third study suggested a mutation rate between 9.5×10^{−3} to 1.2×10^{−3} substitutions/site/year.

Genotypes, with the exception of type 1, appear to be restricted to certain geographical areas: HDV-2 (previously HDV-IIa) is found in Japan, Taiwan and Yakutia; HDV-4 (previously HDV-IIb) in Japan and Taiwan; HDV-3 in the Amazonian region; HDV-5, HDV-6, HDV-7 and HDV-8 in Africa. Genotype 8 has also been isolated from South America. This genotype is usually only found in Africa and may have been imported into South America during the slave trade.

HDV-specific CD8+ T cells can control the virus, but it has been found HDV mutates to escape detection by CD8+ T cells. The immune system's ability to detect the virus can also be lessened by mutations in regions of the hepatitis delta antigen by CD8+ T cells.

== Related species ==
A few other viruses with similarity to HDV have been described in species other than humans, such as snakes, rodents, and a few bird species. Unlike HDV, none of them depend on a Hepadnaviridae (HBV family) virus to replicate. These agents have rod-like structure, a delta antigen, and a ribozyme. HDV and all such relatives are classified in their own realm, Ribozyviria, by the International Committee on Taxonomy of Viruses. The virus itself has a very similar life cycle to that of other viruses, which can link it to others.

== Bibliography ==
- Specter SC, ed. (1999). Viral Hepatitis: Diagnosis, Therapy, and Prevention. Humana Press. ISBN 0-89603-424-0.
- da Fonseca JC (2004). "[Hepatitis fulminant in Brazilian Amazon]". Revista da Sociedade Brasileira de Medicina Tropical. 37. 37 (Suppl 2): 93–5. doi:10.1590/s0037-86822004000700015. PMID 15586904.
- Bensabath G, Soares M (2004). "[The evolution of knowledge about viral hepatitis in Amazon region: from epidemiology and etiology to the prophilaxy]". Revista da Sociedade Brasileira de Medicina Tropical. 37 (Suppl 2): 14–26. doi:10.1590/S0037-86822004000700003. PMID 15586892.
- Fonseca JC, Souza RA, Brasil LM, Araújo JR, Ferreira LC (2004). "Fulminant hepatic failure in children and adolescents in Northern Brazil". Revista da Sociedade Brasileira de Medicina Tropical. 37 (1): 67–9. doi:10.1590/S0037-86822004000100019. PMID 15042190.
