= Nicotinyl methylamide =

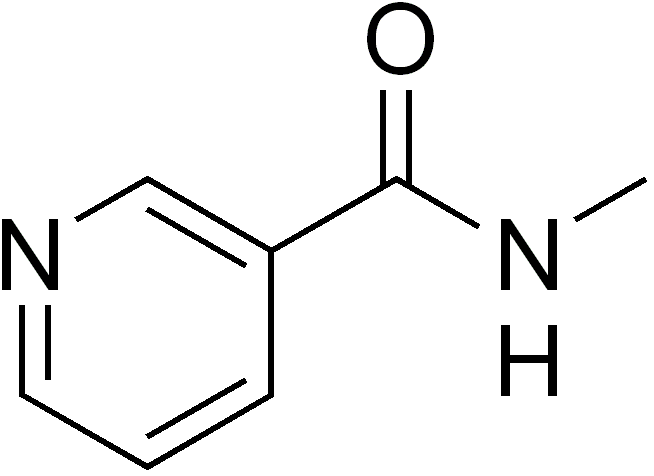

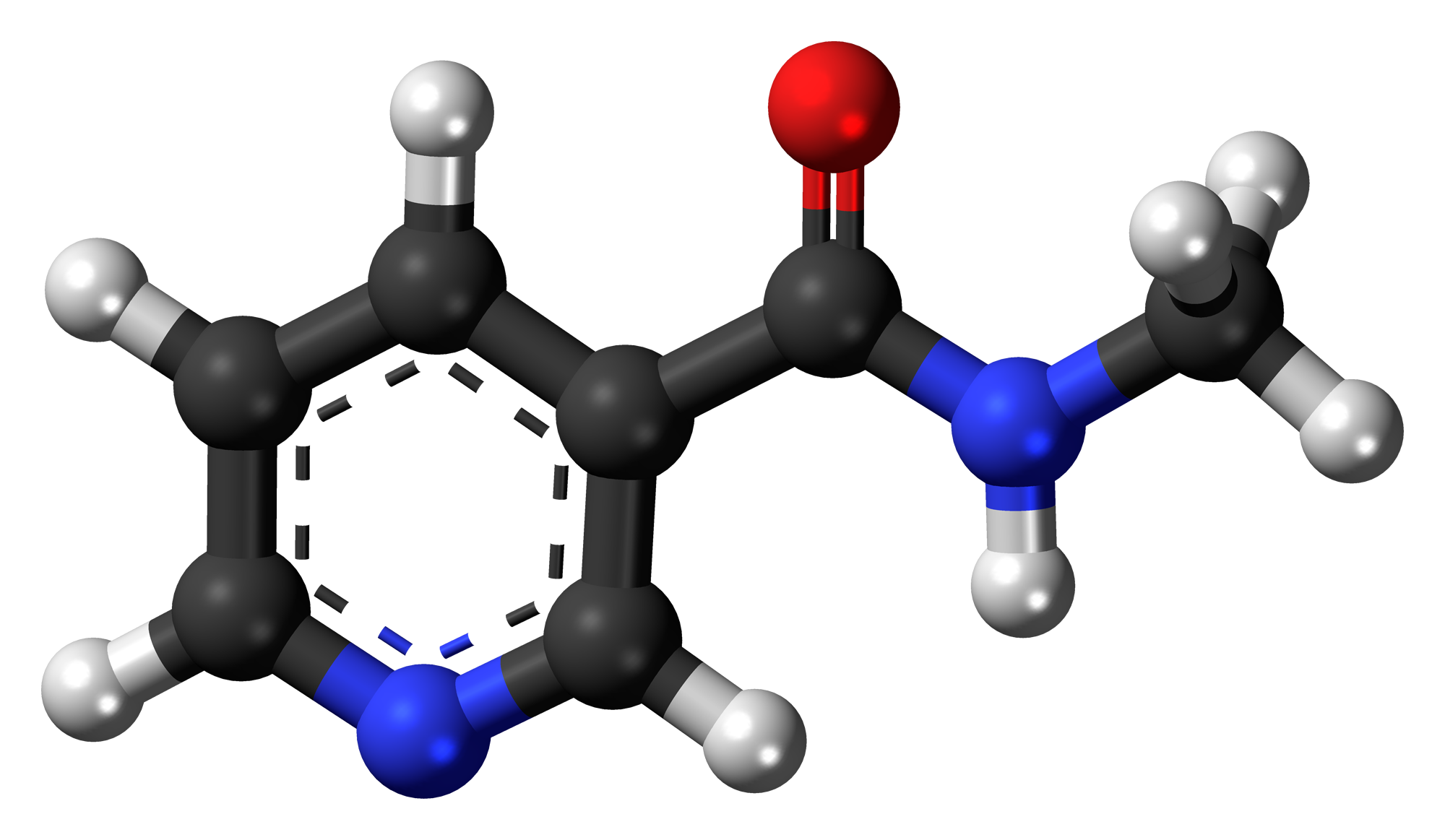

Names
- Preferred IUPAC name N-Methylpyridine-3-carboxamide
- Other names N-Methylnicotinamide; N-Methylniacinamide

Identifiers
| CAS Number | 114-33-0 |
| 3D model (JSmol) | Interactive image |
| Abbreviations | NAN |
| ChEBI | CHEBI:64399 |
| ChemSpider | 58476 |
| DrugBank | DB08840 |
| ECHA InfoCard | 100.003.679 |
| EC Number | 204-046-4 |
| MeSH | C008472 |
| PubChem CID | 64950 |
| UNII | X3I82S5L8I |
| CompTox Dashboard (EPA) | DTXSID00870467 |
- InChI: InChI=1S/C7H8N2O/c1-8-7(10)6-3-2-4-9-5-6/h2-5H,1H3,(H,8,10) Key: ZYVXHFWBYUDDBM-UHFFFAOYSA-N; InChI=1/C7H8N2O/c1-8-7(10)6-3-2-4-9-5-6/h2-5H,1H3,(H,8,10) Key: ZYVXHFWBYUDDBM-UHFFFAOYAC
- SMILES: CNC(=O)C1=CN=CC=C1

Properties
| Chemical formula | C_{7}H_{8}N_{2}O |
| Molar mass | 136.154 g·mol^{−1} |

Pharmacology
| ATC code | A05AB01 (WHO) |
- Except where otherwise noted, data are given for materials in their standard state (at 25 °C [77 °F], 100 kPa). verify (what is ?) Infobox references

Nicotinyl methylamide is an experimental drug with no approved indication. It is also a metabolite of nicotinamide (vitamin B_{3}) and is found in urine.

== See also ==
- Niacin
- Niacinamide
