= Choleretic =

Substance that increase the volume of secretion of bile from the liver

Choleretics (/ˈkoʊlˈəˈrɛtik/ KOH-lə-retik; from Ancient Greek χολή (kholḗ) 'gall, bile' and ῥῆσις (rhêsis) 'flow') are substances that increase the volume of secretion of bile from the liver as well as the amount of solids secreted.

== See also ==
- Cholekinetic
- Hydrocholeretic
- Cholagogue
