= Dermatoses of pregnancy =

- Specialty: Dermatology, obstetrics

Dermatoses of pregnancy are the inflammatory skin diseases that are specific to women while they are pregnant. While some use the term 'polymorphic eruption of pregnancy' to cover these, this term is a synonym used in the UK for Pruritic urticarial papules and plaques of pregnancy, which is the commonest of these skin conditions.

Skin diseases seen during pregnancy include:

Frequency	Onset in pregnancy	Condition
49.7%	Early	Eczema in pregnancy
21.6%	Late	Pruritic urticarial papules and plaques of pregnancy
4.25% Saudi Arabia	Late	Impetigo herpetiformis
4.2%	Late	Gestational pemphigoid also termed pemphigoid gestationis, and previously called herpes gestationis
3%	Late	Intrahepatic cholestasis of pregnancy may also be included in this list.
0.8%	Early	Prurigo gestationis
0.2%	Early	Pruritic folliculitis of pregnancy
	Late	Spangler's Papular dermatitis of pregnancy
		Linear IgM dermatosis of pregnancy

== See also ==
- List of cutaneous conditions
- Breast eczema
- Complications of pregnancy
