= Pruritic folliculitis of pregnancy =

Skin condition

Pruritic folliculitis of pregnancy is a skin condition that occurs in one in 3000 people, about 0.2% of cases, who are in their second to third trimester of pregnancy where the hair follicle becomes inflamed or infected, resulting in a pus filled bump. Some dermatologic conditions aside from pruritic folliculitis during pregnancy include "pruritic urticarial papules and plaques of pregnancy, atopic eruption of pregnancy, pemphigoid gestationis, intrahepatic cholestasis of pregnancy, and pustular psoriasis of pregnancy". This pruritic folliculitis of pregnancy differs from typical pruritic folliculitis; in pregnancy, it is characterized by sterile hair follicles becoming inflamed mainly involving the trunk, contrasting how typical pruritic folliculitis is mainly localized on "the upper back, shoulders, and chest." This condition was first observed after some pregnant individuals showed signs of folliculitis that were different than seen before. The inflammation was thought to be caused by hormonal imbalance, infection from bacteria, fungi, viruses or even an ingrown hair. However, there is no known definitive cause as of yet. These bumps usually begin on the belly and then spread to upper regions of the body as well as the thighs.

This condition does not harm the fetus or the mother and usually resolves after delivery of the baby. The rate of incidence could possibly be higher but due to the unknown etiology of the condition, misdiagnosis, and varying levels of severity, it is difficult to differentiate. Pruritic folliculitis of pregnancy is currently classified as atopic eruption of pregnancy (AEP) in a retrospective study done in 2006 that compared this condition to eczema and prurigo of pregnancy, which occurred in 49.7% and 0.8% of cases respectively, with eczema clearly being more frequent. Unlike typical pruritic folliculitis which does not resolve on its own, pruritic folliculitis of pregnancy clears spontaneously on delivery or in postpartum period. Pruritic folliculitis of pregnancy has no mortality effects or significant adverse effects on the mother or on the fetus.

Currently, there are no treatment guidelines for this condition due to the nature of its unknown etiology but symptom relief is strongly emphasized using non-pharmacological interventions such as warm baths or wearing loose clothing. If itchiness and discomfort persists, benzoyl peroxide, low to mid potency topical steroids, or antihistamines can be tried. Novel treatments have also shown potential in treating case studies of pruritic folliculitis of pregnancy, such as using ultraviolet phototherapy. However, further investigation is still required to study its efficacy and safety in second to third trimester pregnant patients.

== History ==
This condition was first observed in six people in 1981 with many different speculations but no real evidence as to a specific cause. These people had papules starting at various times throughout the second to third trimester with varying severity. Biopsies were taken from these people over a 15 month period in order to examine the composition of these papules. After using H&E, hematoxylin and eosin, to stain the samples, the researchers only found some inflammatory cells like neutrophils, monocytes, lymphocytes, and eosinophils. In four of the samples, immunofluorescence microscopy, where fluorescent antibodies bind to a protein of interest and the expression levels are observed through microscopy, was used but there were no signs of immunoglobulins such as IgG, IgM, IgA or C3 found. Since the first description of this condition, there were very few case reports after, indicating the infrequency of pruritic folliculitis. This was also shown by a prospective study that was conducted in 1994 by Roger et al. that concluded with one individual out of 3,192 pregnant mothers (0.03%) had symptoms which were consistent with the diagnosis of pruritic folliculitis.

== Pathophysiology ==
Folliculitis, by itself, is a common inflammation process of hair follicles in response to infection or damage to the hair follicles. This inflammatory response can be caused by bacteria, fungi, viruses, or simply ingrown hair. However, pruritic folliculitis of pregnancy is different in that it only occurs in pregnant women and during the second or third trimester of pregnancy. There is no clear mechanism in how pruritic folliculitis of pregnancy develops. Because this is a rare condition, there is still currently not enough research to study the cause of it. Some research suggest that this condition may be due to hormone level imbalance during pregnancy . Other research indicate that this condition could be due to immunological changes, such as the reduction of T helper 1 immune cells and the increase in T helper 2 immune cells that occur specifically when pregnant. However, there is not enough evidence to clearly support these claims. Although the pathophysiology of pruritic folliculitis of pregnancy is currently unknown, it has not been significantly linked to harm to either mother or baby. Moreover, this condition resolves after pregnancy and does not affect the development of the baby or recovery of the mother after delivery.

=== Suspected risk factors ===
There are currently no studies into the etiology behind pruritic folliculitis specifically in pregnancy; however, suspected risk factors include:

- Dry skin
- Genetics affecting hormone production
- Poor personal hygiene
- Family history of pruritus in pregnancy
- Family history of eczema, hay fever, or asthma
- Pruritus while taking contraceptive pill prior to pregnancy

== Signs and symptoms ==
The signs and symptoms of pruritic folliculitis of pregnancy include: redness of the skin, small red bumps that surrounds a hair follicle, and red bumps that are filled with pus "that usually appear first on the abdomen and may spread to the chest, upper portion of the back, shoulders, arms, and thighs" and it occurs during the second or third trimester of pregnancy. These symptoms are typically "mildly pruritic or asymptomatic" lasting between one week to several months. However, symptoms usually self-relieves spontaneously within one month after birth.

== Diagnosis ==
The diagnosis of pruritic folliculitis of pregnancy is established based on clinical features such as redness of the skin consisting of small red bumps that surrounds a hair follicle and histopathologic features such as immune cells within the pus along with microscopic testing that shows there is no bacteria, microorganism, or other conditions that could cause itchy skin. Diagnosis for pruritic folliculitis of pregnancy requires patients to go through a biopsy, which consists of taking samples from the tissue to evaluate whether their lesions match the physical factors of pruritic folliculitis. Other pregnancy associated skin diseases must be ruled out alongside obstetric cholestasis, which is a disorder that affects the liver during pregnancy.

There is a great deal of overlap between the following conditions in pregnancy: eczema, prurigo, and pruritic folliculitis. Because of this, they are grouped in a class called atopic eruption of pregnancy. Compared to other pregnancy associated skin conditions, conditions in the class of atopic eruption of pregnancy occurs much earlier.

== Management and treatment ==
There is currently no official treatment guidelines for pruritic folliculitis of pregnancy as its etiology and clinical presentations still require further investigation; however, the goal of treatment is to relieve symptoms without causing harm to the mother or fetus. Non-pharmacological intervention is recommended first before using pharmacological agents to treat symptoms.

Since pruritic folliculitis of pregnancy appears in later stages of pregnancy and self-resolves post-partum, non-pharmacological interventions are recommended first to relieve itching symptoms. These interventions focuses on incorporating lifestyle changes which include: switching to loose-fitting clothes, using emollients, taking warm baths, avoiding harsh soaps, and maintaining good personal hygiene.

If itching symptoms still persist, low to mid potency topical corticosteroids and first-generation antihistamines can be considered and may improve appearance of skin lesions. However, they may also not provide complete relief. Commonly used agents to treat pruritic folliculitis of pregnancy include: 10% topical benzoyl peroxide, 1% topical hydrocortisone, first generation H1 receptor blockers such as diphenhydramine or chlorpheniramine, and a short course of systemic corticosteroids such as prednisone.

Narrowband ultraviolet B phototherapy has also been explored as a novel treatment option for pruritic folliculitis of pregnancy in one case study. Further investigation that leads to clinical trials is still required to understand the efficacy and safety of this unconventional treatment option.

A comprehensive literature review using Medline and Cochrane Database relating to skin disease in pregnancy from 1990-2005 found that pruritic folliculitis of pregnancy has no associated morbidity for the mother or fetus and the condition will go away after pregnancy.

An article from American Family Physician in 2007 states pruritic folliculitis of pregnancy has "no identified adverse effects" on pregnancy risks and that pruritic folliculitis of pregnancy can be treated using topical corticosteroids, topical benzoyl peroxide, or ultraviolet B light therapy.

== Clinical studies and case reports ==
There was a case report about a 30 year old women who was in her tenth week of her second pregnancy. She had widespread papulopustular follicular eruption (rash involving hair follicles) mainly affecting her limbs. She was first treated for a bacteria-associated folliculitis, to which she had some symptom relief. However, the continuation of the pruritic folliculitis still persisted. She was later diagnosised with pruritic folliculitis of pregnancy after a histopathologic test was done to confirm sterility and immune cells. She then started "narrowband ultraviolet (UV) B phototherapy at 70% of the minimal erythemal dose with 20% increments using a three times per week treatment schedule" at 11 weeks of her pregnancy. With this treatment, her skin greatly improved after 10 treatments and completely resolved after 20 treatments. She did not have pruritic folliculitis for the remainder of her pregnancy.

Treatment, whether it is pharmacological or non-pharmacological, can vary in pregnant individuals with pruritic folliculitis. The patients' choice to accept such treatment can vary as well. There have been case reports on resolution of pruritic folliculitis in patients who declined and accepted treatment. There was a case report on a 39-year-old woman who experienced a 2-month long manifestation of pruritic folliculitis during the 27th week of pregnancy. The signs, symptoms, and histology of physical presentation were consistent with pruritic folliculitis. Although benzoyl peroxide was prescribed, the patient declined treatment. Without any treatment, her pruritic folliculitis condition resolved after giving birth. In another case report, a 26 year old woman who was 31 weeks into her pregnancy, reported that these inflamed pustules formed over her upper torso especially around her linea nigra and changed over the course of the last 2 months. The diagnosis was confirmed after laboratory tests showed that there was mainly neutrophils and damaged follicle structures. The symptoms were treated with a 5% topical benzoyl peroxide gel but the pruritic folliculitis completely went away after the first week after delivering the baby.

In an effort to establish a possible pathophysiologic mechanism behind pruritic folliculitis of pregnancy, a 2005 case study found pityrosporum yeast in the hair follicles of a pregnant 24 year-old patient. Pityrosporum yeast is typically grouped in hair follicles, leading to an inflammation of the pore causing folliculitis and symptoms of itching. However, this patient's pruritic folliculitis lesions did not improve after delivery of the baby. This finding may lead investigators to believe that this patient's lesions may not be contributed from the pregnancy, but instead it can be speculated that the reason behind the presence of this patient's lesions postpartum is due to hot and humid weather, making her lesions more difficult to heal after giving birth.

== See also ==
- Prurigo gestationis
- List of cutaneous conditions
- Pruritic urticarial papules and plaques of pregnancy (PUPPP) rash
- Intrahepatic cholestasis of pregnancy
