= Gestational pemphigoid =

- Other names: Pemphigoid gestationis, herpes gestationis
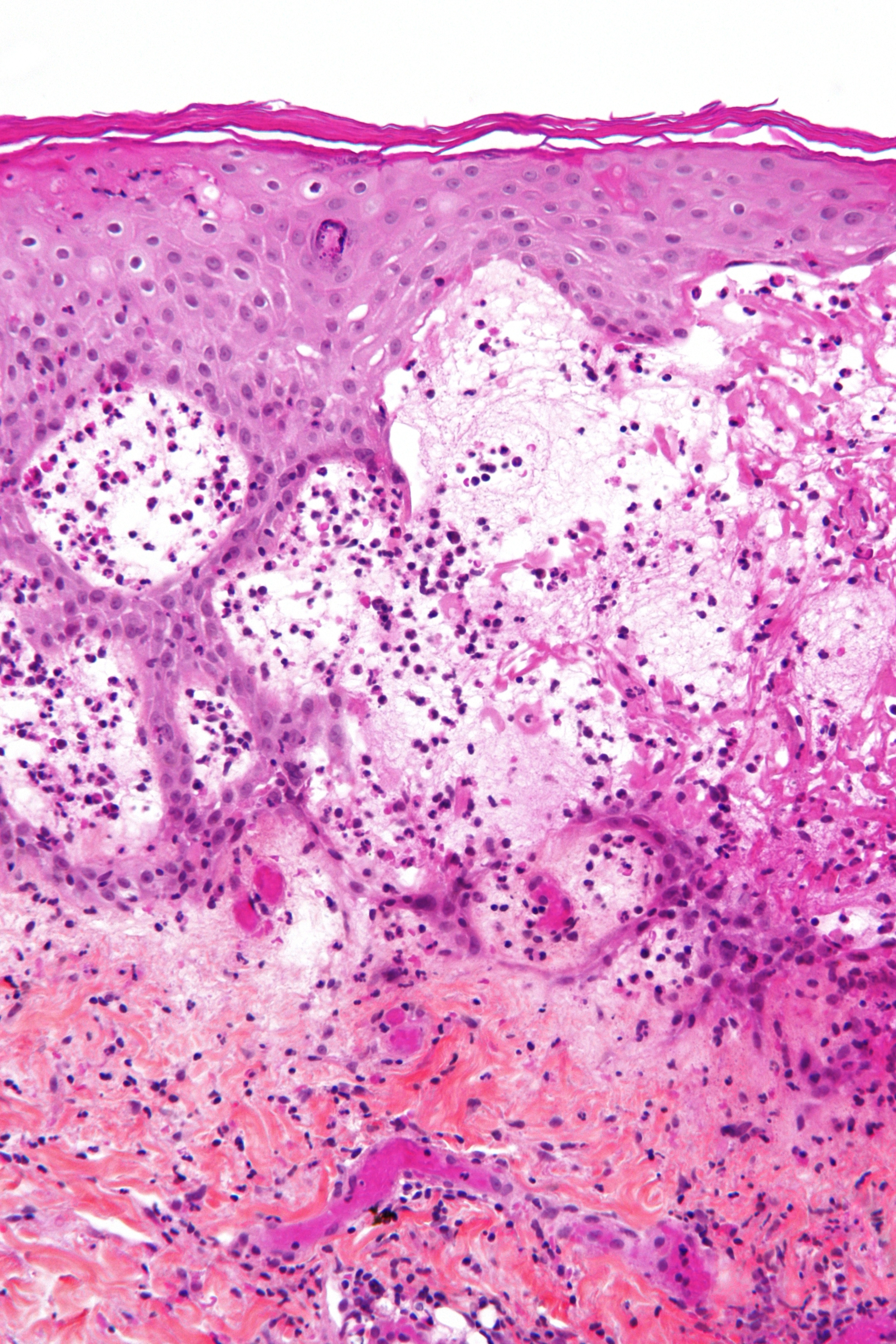
- Micrograph of gestational pemphigoid showing the characteristic subepidermal blisters and abundant eosinophils. HPS stain.
- Specialty: Dermatology
- Symptoms: Blisters, itch, hives
- Complications: Premature delivery of a small baby, a few who may be born with blisters and urticaria
- Usual onset: Middle of pregnancy or shortly after
- Duration: Around 6-months
- Causes: Autoimmune
- Risk factors: Pregnancy, molar pregnancy, choriocarcinoma, oral contraceptive pill
- Diagnostic method: Appearance, skin biopsy, immunofluorescence
- Differential diagnosis: Pruritic urticarial papules and plaques of pregnancy, erythema multiforme, drug reactions, blistering scabies
- Treatment: Corticosteroid
- Frequency: 1 in 20,000 to 50,000 pregnancies

Gestational pemphigoid (GP) is a rare autoimmune variant of the skin disease bullous pemphigoid, and first appears in pregnancy. It presents with tense blisters, small bumps, hives and intense itching, usually starting around the navel before spreading to limbs in mid-pregnancy or shortly after delivery. The head, face and mouth are not usually affected.

It may flare after delivery before resolving around three to six months after the pregnancy. It can be triggered by subsequent pregnancies, menstrual periods and oral contraceptive pill. A molar pregnancy and choriocarcinoma can provoke it. In some people, it persists long-term. It is associated with premature delivery of a small baby, a few who may be born with blisters and urticaria, which generally resolves within six weeks. It does not spread from one person to another, and does not run in families.

Diagnosis is by visulaization, biopsy and immunofluorescence. It can resemble pruritic urticarial papules and plaques of pregnancy, erythema multiforme, drug reactions and blistering scabies.

Around 1 in 20,000 to 50,000 pregnancies are affected. It was originally called herpes gestationis because of the blistering appearance, although it is not associated with the herpes virus.

== Signs and symptoms ==
Diagnosis of GP becomes clear when skin lesions progress to tense blisters during the second or third trimester. The face and mucous membranes are usually spared. GP typically starts as a blistering rash in the navel area and then spreads over the entire body. It is sometimes accompanied by raised, hot, painful welts called plaques. After one to two weeks, large, tense blisters typically develop on the red plaques, containing clear or blood-stained fluid. GP creates a histamine response that causes extreme relentless itching (pruritus). GP is characterized by flaring and remission during the gestational and sometimes post partum period. Usually after delivery, lesions will heal within months, but may reoccur during menstruation.

== Causes ==
Pathogenically, it is a type II hypersensitivity reaction where circulating complement-fixing IgG antibodies bind to an antigen (a 180-kDa protein, BP-180) in the hemidesmosomes (attach basal cells of epidermis to the basal lamina and hence to dermis) of the dermoepidermal junction, leading to blister formation as loss of hemidesmosomes causes the epidermis to separate from dermis. The immune response is even more highly restricted to the NC16A domain. The primary site of autoimmunity seems not to be the skin, but the placenta, as antibodies bind not only to the basement membrane zone of the epidermis, but also to that of chorionic and amniotic epithelia. Aberrant expression of MHC class II molecules on the chorionic villi suggests an allogenic immune reaction to a placental matrix antigen, thought to be of paternal origin. Recently, both IgA22 and IgE24 antibodies to either BP180 or BP230 have also been detected in pemphigoid gestationis.

=== Risk ===
Pregnant women with GP should be monitored for conditions that may affect the fetus, including, but not limited to, low or decreasing volume of amniotic fluid, preterm labor, and intrauterine growth retardation. Onset of GP in the first or second trimester and presence of blisters may lead to adverse pregnancy outcomes including decreased gestational age at delivery, preterm birth, and low birth weight children. Such pregnancies should be considered high risk and appropriate obstetric care should be provided. Systemic corticosteroid treatment, in contrast, does not substantially affect pregnancy outcomes, and its use for GP in pregnant women is justified. GP typically reoccurs in subsequent pregnancies. Passive transfer of the mother’s antibodies to the fetus causes some (about 10%) newborns to develop mild skin lesions, but these typically will resolve within weeks of parturition.

== Diagnosis ==
=== Differential diagnosis ===
GP often is confused with pruritic urticarial papules and plaques of pregnancy (PUPPP), especially if it occurs in a first pregnancy. PUPPP typically begins in stretch mark areas of the abdomen and usually ends within two weeks after delivery. PUPPP is not an autoimmune disease.

Diagnosing GP is done by biopsy using direct immunofluorescence, appearance, and blood studies.

== Treatment ==
The most accepted way to treat GP is with the use of corticosteroids, i.e. prednisone; and/or topical steroids, i.e. clobetasol and betamethasone. Suppressing the immune system with corticosteroids helps by decreasing the number of antibodies attacking the skin. Treating GP can be difficult and can take several months. Some cases of GP persist for many years. In the post partum period, if necessary, the full range of immunosuppressive treatment may be administered for cases unresponsive to corticosteroid treatments, such as tetracyclines, nicotinamide, cyclophosphamide, ciclosporin, goserelin, azathioprine, dapsone, rituximumab, or plasmaphoresis, or intravenous immunoglobulin may sometimes be considered when the symptoms are severe.

There is no cure for GP. Women who have GP are considered in remission if they are no longer blistering. Remission can last indefinitely, or until a subsequent pregnancy. GP usually occurs in subsequent pregnancies; however, it often seems more manageable because it is anticipated.

== See also ==
- Bullous pemphigoid
- Cicatricial pemphigoid
- List of target antigens in pemphigoid
- List of immunofluorescence findings for autoimmune bullous conditions
