= ABCB11 =

Protein-coding gene in humans

Identifiers
- Aliases: ABCB11, ABC16, BRIC2, BSEP, PFIC-2, PFIC2, PGY4, SPGP, ATP binding cassette subfamily B member 11
- External IDs: OMIM: 603201; MGI: 1351619; GeneCards: ABCB11

Gene location (Human)
Chr.	Chromosome 2 (human)
Band	2q31.1	Start	168,915,498 bp
Band	2q31.1	End	169,031,324 bp

Gene location (Mouse)
Chr.	Chromosome 2 (mouse)
Band	2 C2|2 39.69 cM	Start	69,068,626 bp
Band	2 C2|2 39.69 cM	End	69,172,960 bp
RNA expression pattern
Bgee	Human / Mouse (ortholog); Top expressed in: right lobe of liver; testicle; mucosa of transverse colon; left testis; subcutaneous adipose tissue; right testis; olfactory zone of nasal mucosa; islet of Langerhans; gonad; ventricular zone / Top expressed in: left lobe of liver; epithelium of small intestine; sexually immature organism; yolk sac; lumbar subsegment of spinal cord; spermatid; migratory enteric neural crest cell; esophagus; stomach; medial head of gastrocnemius muscle; More reference expression data
BioGPS	n/a
Gene ontology
Molecular function	ATPase-coupled transmembrane transporter activity; nucleotide binding; ABC-type bile acid transporter activity; transporter activity; canalicular bile acid transmembrane transporter activity; ATPase activity; P-type sodium transporter activity; ATP binding
Cellular component	integral component of membrane; plasma membrane; apical part of cell; integral component of plasma membrane; intercellular canaliculus; extracellular exosome; membrane
Biological process	canalicular bile acid transport; transmembrane transport; bile acid biosynthetic process; sodium ion transmembrane transport; bile acid and bile salt transport; transport
Sources:Amigo / QuickGO
Orthologs
Databases	NCBI: entry; OMA: entry
Species	Human	Mouse
Entrez	8647	27413
Ensembl	ENSG00000276582; ENSG00000073734	ENSMUSG00000027048
UniProt	O95342	Q9QY30
RefSeq (mRNA)	NM_003742	NM_021022; NM_001363492
RefSeq (protein)	NP_003733	NP_066302; NP_001350421
Location (UCSC)	Chr 2: 168.92 – 169.03 Mb	Chr 2: 69.07 – 69.17 Mb
PubMed search
- Wikidata
View/Edit Human	View/Edit Mouse

ATP-binding cassette, sub-family B member 11 (ABCB11), also known as the bile salt export pump (BSEP), is a protein which in humans is encoded by the ABCB11 gene.

== Function ==
The product of the ABCB11 gene is an ABC transporter named BSEP (bile salt export pump), or sPgp (sister of P-glycoprotein). This membrane-associated protein is a member of the superfamily of ATP-binding cassette (ABC) transporters. ABC proteins transport various molecules across extra- and intra-cellular membranes. ABC genes are divided into seven distinct subfamilies (ABC1, MDR/TAP, MRP, ALD, OABP, GCN20, White).

This protein is a member of the MDR/TAP subfamily. Some members of the MDR/TAP subfamily are involved in multidrug resistance. This particular protein is responsible for the transport of taurocholate and other cholate conjugates from hepatocytes (liver cells) to the bile. In humans, the activity of this transporter is the major determinant of bile formation and bile flow.

== Clinical significance ==
ABCB11 is a gene associated with progressive familial intrahepatic cholestasis type 2 (PFIC2). PFIC2 caused by mutations in the ABCB11 gene increases the risk of hepatocellular carcinoma in early life. Benign recurrent intrahepatic cholestasis (BRIC) is associated with episodic cholestatic jaundice and mutations in ATP8B1 or ABCB11.

Bile salts from the cytoplasm of hepatocytes are transported by the bile salt export pump (BSEP) into bile canaliculi. When bile salt export is deficient due to mutation in the ABCB11 gene, this can lead to intrahepatic toxic accumulation of the bile salts. Individuals with such mutations have an increased incidence of hepatocellular carcinoma or cholangiocarcinoma.
