= ABCB4 =

Protein-coding gene in humans

Identifiers
- Aliases: ABCB4, ABC21, GBD1, ICP3, MDR2, MDR2/3, MDR3, PFIC-3, PGY3, ATP binding cassette subfamily B member 4
- External IDs: OMIM: 171060; MGI: 97569; GeneCards: ABCB4
Enzyme activity
EC #	BRENDA	ExPASy	KEGG	MetaCyc
7.6.2.1	↗	↗	↗	↗
7.6.2.2	↗	↗	↗	↗

Gene location (Human)
Chr.	Chromosome 7 (human)
Band	7q21.12	Start	87,401,696 bp
Band	7q21.12	End	87,480,435 bp

Gene location (Mouse)
Chr.	Chromosome 5 (mouse)
Band	5 A1|5 3.43 cM	Start	8,943,717 bp
Band	5 A1|5 3.43 cM	End	9,009,231 bp
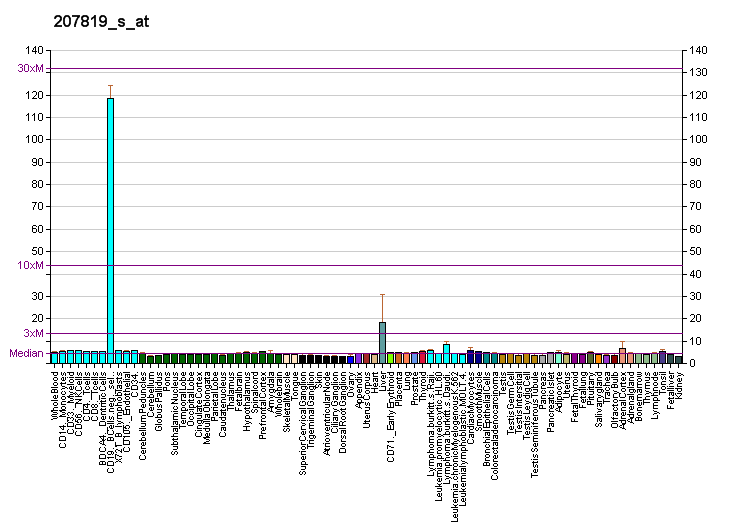
RNA expression pattern
Bgee	Human / Mouse (ortholog); Top expressed in: right lobe of liver; secondary oocyte; buccal mucosa cell; testicle; right adrenal gland; left adrenal gland; right adrenal cortex; left adrenal cortex; biceps brachii; spleen / Top expressed in: left lobe of liver; tibialis anterior muscle; vastus lateralis muscle; extensor digitorum longus muscle; plantaris muscle; tibiofemoral joint; ankle; gastrocnemius muscle; muscle of thigh; triceps brachii muscle; More reference expression data
BioGPS	More reference expression data
Gene ontology
Molecular function	ATPase-coupled transmembrane transporter activity; nucleotide binding; ABC-type xenobiotic transporter activity; phosphatidylcholine transporter activity; phosphatidylcholine floppase activity; ATPase activity; protein binding; hydrolase activity; ATP binding; phospholipid transporter activity; ceramide floppase activity
Cellular component	cytoplasm; integral component of membrane; membrane; plasma membrane; integral component of plasma membrane; intercellular canaliculus; apical plasma membrane; membrane raft; extracellular exosome; cytoplasmic vesicle; clathrin-coated vesicle; nucleoplasm; cytosol; focal adhesion; actin cytoskeleton; brush border membrane; apical part of cell
Biological process	lipid transport; cellular response to bile acid; positive regulation of cholesterol transport; positive regulation of phospholipid translocation; xenobiotic transmembrane transport; lipid metabolism; positive regulation of phospholipid transport; response to fenofibrate; xenobiotic transport; transmembrane transport; lipid homeostasis; bile acid secretion; phospholipid translocation; response to hypoxia; placenta development; brain development; lactation; circadian rhythm; hormone transport; response to organic substance; response to mycotoxin; response to organic cyclic compound; response to isoquinoline alkaloid; response to nutrient levels; response to estradiol; response to vitamin A; carbohydrate export; response to vitamin D; maintenance of blood-brain barrier; cellular response to mycotoxin; daunorubicin transport; response to morphine; xenobiotic export; response to cadmium ion; intestinal absorption; negative regulation of cell death; establishment of blood-brain barrier; cellular response to external biotic stimulus; cellular response to antibiotic; cellular response to alkaloid; cellular response to estradiol stimulus; cellular response to organic cyclic compound; cellular hyperosmotic salinity response; response to dexamethasone; cellular response to dexamethasone stimulus; response to thyroxine; response to antineoplastic agent; ceramide translocation; response to L-glutamate; response to glycoside; cellular response to borneol; cellular response to L-glutamate; response to codeine; response to quercetin; response to cyclosporin A; xenobiotic transport across blood-brain barrier; establishment of blood-retinal barrier; positive regulation of response to drug; regulation of lipid metabolic process; regulation of intestinal absorption; transport
Sources:Amigo / QuickGO
Orthologs
Databases	NCBI: entry; OMA: entry
Species	Human	Mouse
Entrez	5244	18670
Ensembl	ENSG00000005471	ENSMUSG00000042476
UniProt	P21439	P21440
RefSeq (mRNA)	NM_000443; NM_018849; NM_018850	NM_008830
RefSeq (protein)	NP_000434; NP_061337; NP_061338	NP_032856
Location (UCSC)	Chr 7: 87.4 – 87.48 Mb	Chr 5: 8.94 – 9.01 Mb
PubMed search
- Wikidata
View/Edit Human	View/Edit Mouse

The ATP-binding cassette 4 (ABCB4) gene encodes multidrug resistance protein 3. ABCB4 is associated with progressive familial intrahepatic cholestasis type 3 and intrahepatic cholestasis of pregnancy.

The membrane-associated protein encoded by this gene is a member of the superfamily of ATP-binding cassette (ABC) transporters. ABC proteins transport various molecules across extra- and intra-cellular membranes. ABC genes are divided into seven distinct subfamilies (ABC1, MDR/TAP, MRP, ALD, OABP, GCN20, White). This protein is a member of the MDR/TAP subfamily. Members of the MDR/TAP subfamily are involved in multidrug resistance as well as antigen presentation. This gene encodes a full transporter and member of the p-glycoprotein family of membrane proteins with phosphatidylcholine as its substrate (flippase activity). The function of this protein has not yet been determined; however, it may involve transport of phospholipids from liver hepatocytes into bile. Alternative splicing of this gene results in several products of undetermined function.

== Cancer ==
ABCB4 gene has been observed progressively downregulated in human papillomavirus-positive neoplastic keratinocytes derived from uterine cervical preneoplastic lesions at different levels of malignancy. For this reason, ABCB4 is likely to be associated with tumorigenesis and may be a potential prognostic marker for uterine cervical preneoplastic lesions progression.

Other conditions that have been associated with mutations in this gene include low phospholipid associated cholelithiasis syndrome, high gamma glutamyl transferase intrahepatic cholestasis of pregnancy, chronic cholangiopathy and adult biliary fibrosis.
