= Impetigo herpetiformis =

- Other names: Pustular psoriasis of pregnancy
- Specialty: Dermatology, obstetrics

Impetigo herpetiformis is a form of severe pustular psoriasis occurring in pregnancy which may occur during any trimester.

== Signs and symptoms ==
The typical lesions are centrifugally extending erythematous patches with marginally grouped sterile pustules; they can also develop erosion, crust, and impetiginization. These lesions are mainly seen in flexural regions. Patients may experience vegetative lesions resembling Pemphigus vegetans, though they are uncommon. It is possible to see mucosal lesions in the tongue, mouth, and even esophagus in addition to nail involvement.

In impetigo herpetiformis, hypoparathyroidism and hypocalcemia may be encountered. Systematic symptoms such as malaise, hypovolemic shock, vomiting, chills, fever, diarrhea, and seizures may also be seen.

== Causes ==
The cause of impetigo herpetiformis is not yet clear. Some evidence suggests that genetic factors may play a role in the development of impetigo herpetiformis, such as the number of familial cases.

== Diagnosis ==
The diagnosis of impetigo herpetiformis is supported by clinical and laboratory findings, and histological examination primarily reveals neutrophilc inflammatory infiltrate, epidermal acanthosis, and papillomatosis with focal parakeratosis. Spongiform pustules of Kogoj are intraepidermal multilocular microabscesses that are formed by neutrophil collections.

Laboratory findings include iron deficiency anemia, hypoalbuminemia, hypocalcemia, elevated erythrocyte sedimentation rate, and leukocytosis.

== Treatment ==
Pustular psoriasis is still primarily treated with systemic corticosteroids, which have been used for many years. If a patient is not responding to corticosteroids, cyclosporine may be a useful medication. In impetigo herpetiformis, the use of antibiotics appears to be beneficial, despite the fact that they cannot completely eradicate the illness.

== See also ==
- Dermatoses of pregnancy
- List of cutaneous conditions
