= Breast eczema =

Medical condition

- Other names: Nipple eczema, nipple dermatitis, breast dermatitis
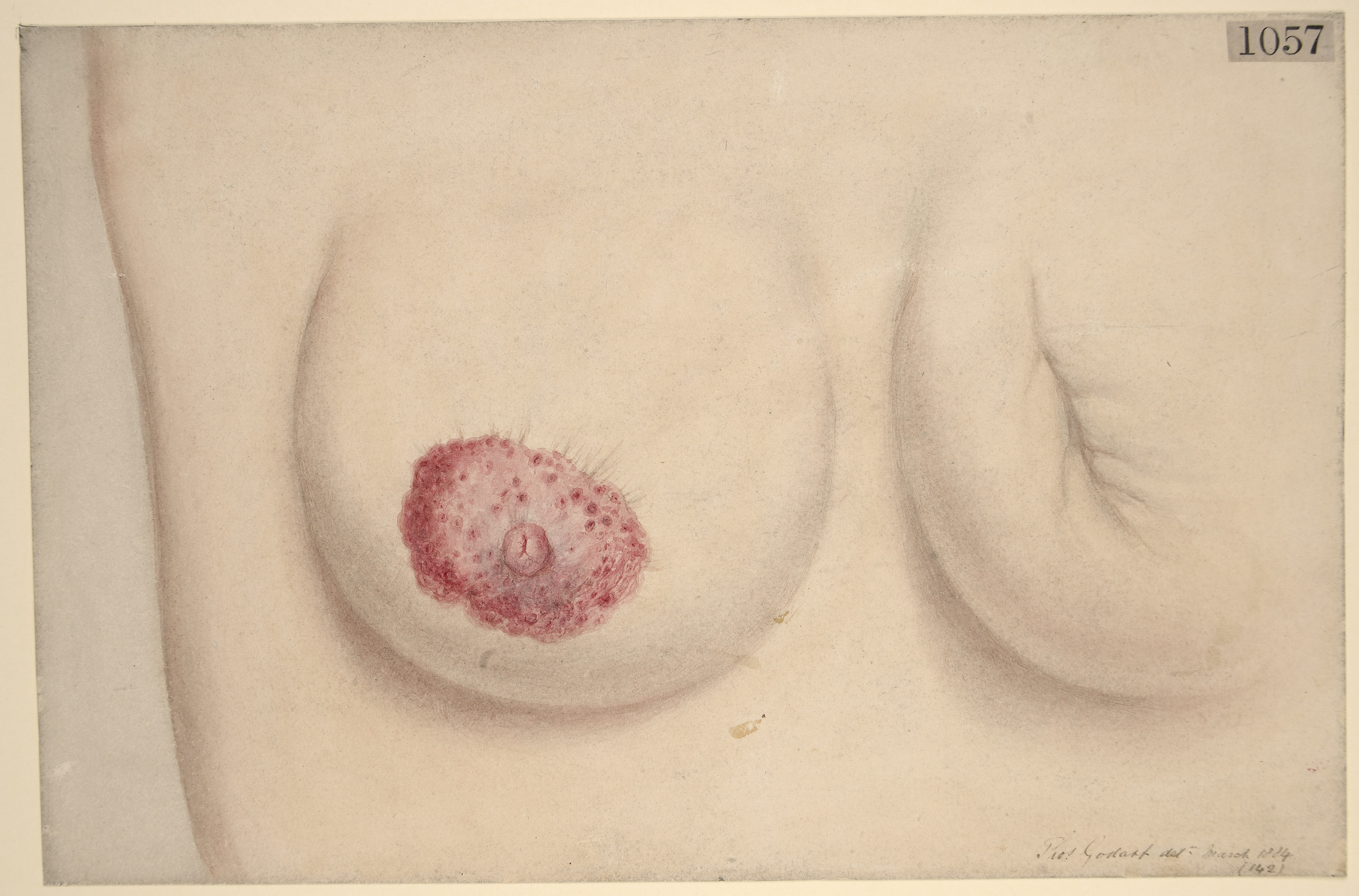
- Specialty: Dermatology

The term breast eczema refers to benign dermatitis seen in the skin of the breast. It can affect the nipples, areolae, and surrounding areas.

Eczema of the nipples is the moist type, with oozing and crusting. Painful fissuring is frequently seen, especially in nursing mothers. It will often occur in pregnancy, even without breastfeeding.

Persistent eczema of the nipple, especially in the middle-aged and elderly, should be discussed with a doctor, as a rare type of breast cancer called Paget's disease can cause similar symptoms.

== Treatment ==
As with other types of eczema, treatment of breast eczema is generally focused on alleviating the symptoms.

A doctor may prescribe topical steroids – specifically glucocorticoids such as mometasone or methylprednisolone aceponate – to be applied to the affected area.

== See also ==
- Breast disease
- Complications of pregnancy
- Dermatoses of pregnancy
- Skin lesion
