= Progressive familial intrahepatic cholestasis =

- Other names: PFIC
- Specialty: Internal medicine

Progressive familial intrahepatic cholestasis (PFIC) is a group of familial cholestatic conditions caused by defects in biliary epithelial transporters. The clinical presentation usually occurs first in childhood with progressive cholestasis. This usually leads to failure to thrive, cirrhosis, and the need for liver transplantation.

== Types ==
Types of progressive familial intrahepatic cholestasis are as follows:

- Type 1 (OMIM #211600), also called Byler disease
- Type 2 (OMIM #601847), also called ABCB11 deficiency or BSEP deficiency
- Type 3 (OMIM #602347), also called ABCB4 deficiency or MDR3 deficiency
- Type 4 (OMIM #615878), from mutation in TJP2

== Signs and symptoms ==
The onset of the disease is usually before age 2, but patients have been diagnosed with PFIC even into adolescence. Of the three entities, PFIC-1 usually presents earliest. Patients usually present in early childhood with cholestasis, jaundice, and failure to thrive. Intense pruritus is characteristic; in patients who present in adolescence, it has been linked with suicide. Patients may have fat malabsorption, leading to fat soluble vitamin deficiency, and complications, including osteopenia.

== Pathogenesis ==
Progressive familial intrahepatic cholestasis is inherited in an autosomal recessive pattern.

PFIC-1 is caused by a variety of mutations in ATP8B1, a gene coding for a P-type ATPase protein, FIC-1, that is responsible for phospholipid translocation across membranes. It was previously identified as clinical entities known as Byler's disease and Greenland-Eskimo familial cholestasis. Patients with PFIC-1 may also have watery diarrhea, in addition to the clinical features below, due to FIC-1's expression in the intestine. How ATP8B1 mutation leads to cholestasis is not yet well understood.

PFIC-2 is caused by a variety of mutations in ABCB11, the gene that codes for the bile salt export pump, or BSEP. Retention of bile salts within hepatocytes, which are the only cell type to express BSEP, causes hepatocellular damage and cholestasis.

PFIC-3 is caused by a variety of mutations in ABCB4, the gene encoding multidrug resistance protein 3 (MDR3), which codes for a floppase responsible for phosphatidylcholine translocation. The defective phosphatidylcholine translocation leads to a lack of phosphatidylcholine in bile. Phosphatidylcholine normally chaperones bile acids, preventing damage to the biliary epithelium. The free or "unchaperoned" bile acids in bile of patients with MDR3 deficiency cause a cholangitis. Biochemically, this is of note, as PFIC-3 is associated with a markedly elevated GGT.

The inheritance pattern of all three forms of PFIC defined to date is autosomal recessive.

Liver biopsies typically show evidence of cholestasis (including bile plugs and bile infarcts), duct hypoplasia, hepatocellular injury, and Zone 3 fibrosis. Giant cell change and other features of hepatocellular injury are more pronounced in PFIC-2 than in PFIC-1 or PFIC-3. End-stage disease in all forms of PFIC defined to date is characterized by bridging fibrosis with duct proliferation in peri-portal regions.

== Diagnosis ==
Biochemical markers include a normal GGT for PFIC-1 and -2, with a markedly elevated GGT for PFIC-3. Serum bile acid levels are grossly elevated. Serum cholesterol levels are typically not elevated, as is seen usually in cholestasis, as the pathology is due to a transporter as opposed to an anatomical problem with biliary cells.

== Treatment ==
Initial treatment is supportive, with the use of agents to treat cholestasis and pruritus, including the following:

- Ursodeoxycholic acid
- Cholestyramine
- Rifampin
- Naloxone, in refractory cases

The partial external biliary diversion (PEBD) procedure is a surgical approach that diverts bile from the gallbladder externally into an ileostomy bag.

Patients should be supplemented with fat-soluble vitamins, and occasionally medium-chain triglycerides in order to improve growth. When liver synthetic dysfunction is significant, patients should be listed for transplantation. Family members should be tested for PFIC mutations, in order to determine risk of transmission.

== Prognosis ==
The disease is typically progressive, leading to fulminant liver failure and death in childhood, in the absence of liver transplantation. Hepatocellular carcinoma may develop in PFIC-2 at a very early age; even toddlers have been affected.

== Epidemiology ==
- Consanguinity is believed to be a major risk factor.
- Similar transport protein mutations are believed to pose a higher risk for intrahepatic cholestasis of pregnancy.

== See also ==
- Alagille syndrome
- Intrahepatic cholestasis of pregnancy
- Liver transplantation
