= Intrahepatic cholestasis of pregnancy =

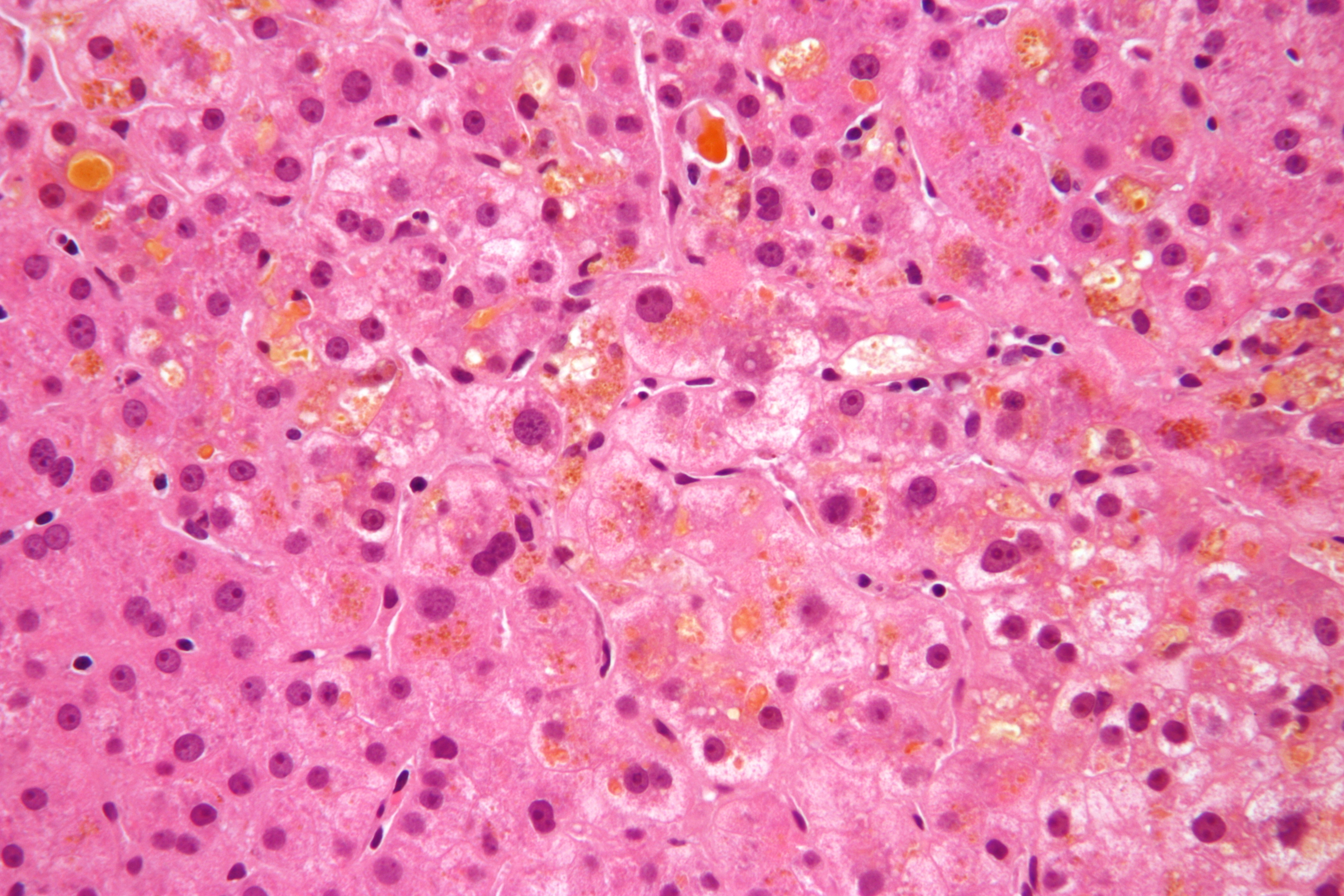
- High magnification micrograph showing liver cholestasis.
- Specialty: Obstetrics

Intrahepatic cholestasis of pregnancy (ICP), also known as obstetric cholestasis, cholestasis of pregnancy, jaundice of pregnancy, and prurigo gravidarum, is a medical condition in which cholestasis occurs during pregnancy. It typically presents with itching and can lead to complications for both mother and fetus.

Itching is a common symptom of pregnancy, affecting around 23% of women. The majority of times, itching is a minor annoyance caused by changes to the skin, especially that of the abdomen. However, there are instances when itching may be a symptom of ICP. Although typically noticed on the palms of the hands and the soles of the feet, the itching can occur anywhere on the body.

Onset is mostly in the third trimester, but may begin earlier.

== Signs and symptoms ==
Most women with this condition present in the third trimester (although it can present as early as seven weeks) with itching without a rash. Typically, the itching is localized to the palms of the hands and soles of the feet, but can be anywhere on the body.

Hallmarks of ICP include the following symptoms:

Most common:

- Itching, in particular but not limited to that of the palms of the hands and soles of the feet, without presence of a rash
- Itching that is more noticeable in the evening
- Darker urine

Less common:

- Lighter stools
- Increased clotting time (due to possibly associated vitamin K deficiency)
- Fatigue
- Increased nausea
- Decrease in appetite
- Jaundice (less than 10% of women)
- Upper right quadrant pain

Not all ICP sufferers have all of the above symptoms.

== Mechanism ==
The causes of intrahepatic cholestasis of pregnancy are still not fully understood, but are thought to be caused through a combination of genetic, hormonal, and environmental factors.

- ICP commonly occurs in the third trimester at the time when hormone levels are at their highest.
- Twin and triplet pregnancies, which are associated with higher hormone levels, show a higher incidence of ICP.
- ICP resolves quickly after delivery, when placental hormone production ceases.
- Older high-dose estrogen oral contraceptive pills could cause features of ICP.

=== Estrogens ===
Estrogens, and particularly glucuronides such as estradiol-17β-D-glucuronide, have been shown to cause cholestasis in animal studies, by reducing bile acid uptake by hepatocytes.

=== Progesterone ===
Treatment with progesterone in the third trimester of pregnancy has been shown to be associated with the development of ICP, and levels of metabolites of progesterone, particularly sulfated progesterone, are higher in patients with ICP than unaffected women, suggesting that progesterone may have a bigger role than estrogen in ICP.

=== Genetic factors ===
Clustering of cases of ICP in families, geographic variation in rates of ICP, and recurrence of ICP in 45-70% of subsequent pregnancies all suggest a genetic component to the disease. Genetic mutations in the hepatocellular transport protein ABCB4 (MDR3), which controls secretion of phosphatidylcholine into bile, have been found in cases of ICP.

Genetic mutations affecting hepatic bile salt transport molecules have also been found in patients with progressive familial intrahepatic cholestasis. It has been found that mothers of patients with this disease have a higher incidence of ICP, suggesting that heterozygote carriers of these mutations are also predisposed to ICP.

In addition to genetic changes to bile salt transport molecules, high levels of estrogen glucuronides have been shown to inhibit the bile salt export pump (BSEP) ABCB11, and high levels of progesterone to inhibit the ABCB4 (MDR3) phospholipid transporter.

Consequently, both genetic mutations in hepatocyte proteins involved in bile secretion together with inhibition of those proteins by high levels of hormone metabolites in pregnancy may have roles in the pathogenesis of ICP.

=== Environmental factors ===
A number of features of ICP suggest that environmental factors also have a role in the disease:

- It has been reported that the incidence of ICP is higher in winter than summer.
- The incidence of ICP in Chile has dropped from 14% of pregnancies before 1975 to 4% in 2016.
- ICP recurs in between 60% and 90% of subsequent pregnancies.
- Low serum selenium levels have been linked to ICP, although the role of selenium in bile secretion is not known.

== Diagnosis ==
ICP is diagnosed by blood tests including a serum bile acid test and liver function test. While most pregnant women experience some itch from time to time, itching without a visible rash, or persistent or extensive itch symptoms should be immediately reported to the midwife or obstetrician for further investigation. As the level of itch does not correlate with bile acid levels (shown to be the most likely cause of stillbirth in ICP), the itch in ICP can range from being mild to severe.

Immediate investigation should include measurement of plasma ALT and serum bile acids. Although the ALT level may be raised, 20% of women with ICP will always have a normal LFT test result. This, plus pruritus of palms and soles, could be considered as potentially diagnostic of ICP but only with elevated bile acid levels (however the plasma AST is not always elevated in ICP patients).

Other problems with the liver that occur in pregnancy should be considered by the treating clinician. These include preeclampsia, the HELLP syndrome, and acute fatty liver of pregnancy. Furthermore, other causes of hepatitis, like hepatitis viruses, cancer and certain medications, should also be considered.

== Treatment ==
Many providers will prescribe ursodeoxycholic acid. The most recent trial, PITCHES, did not show an overall beneficial effect, but some researchers believe that it may still be useful to offer ursodeoxycholic acid to women whose bile acids are > 40 μmol/litre. While there is no cure for ICP, and no way to guarantee a successful outcome, studies have shown a slightly better fetal and maternal outcome from administration of ursodeoxycholic acid, whereas cholestyramine appears to only relieve itching.

There is no evidence that giving oral water-soluble Vitamin K may help to avoid the risk of hemorrhage at delivery. However, experts in ICP will prescribe this if the woman reports pale stools, has very severe ICP (bile acids > 100 μmol/litre) or has a known clotting problem.

Delivery from 34 weeks may be important to reduce the risk of stillbirth, as a 2019 study identified the level of bile acids at which stillbirth risk rises. This research also suggests that around 90% of women with ICP could wait until 39 weeks of pregnancy to be induced. However, this relies on regular bile acid testing with rapid return of results.

== Risks if untreated ==
Maternal consequences include the following:

- Itching, which can become intense and debilitating
- Spontaneous premature labour when bile acids rise above 40 μmol/litre

Fetal consequences include:

- Premature labour, as above
- Fetal distress
- Meconium ingestion
- Stillbirth

In most cases induction is typically recommended anywhere from 34 to 39 weeks.

In the United States, some researchers have suggested that the risk of stillbirth is lower if induction occurs at 36 weeks. Whilst Ovadia's research suggests differently, in the United States bile acid tests can take up to seven days to be processed, and this means that it may be more prudent to base delivery on the US research.

== See also ==
- Cholestasis
- Cholestatic pruritus
- List of cutaneous conditions
- Pruritic urticarial papules and plaques of pregnancy (PUPPP) an itchy condition of pregnancy that is associated with a rash.
