= Phospholipid-transporting ATPase IC =

Protein-coding gene in the species Homo sapiens

ATP8B1

Identifiers
- Aliases: ATP8B1, ATPIC, BRIC, FIC1, ICP1, PFIC, PFIC1, ATPase phospholipid transporting 8B1
- External IDs: OMIM: 602397; MGI: 1859665; GeneCards: ATP8B1
Enzyme activity
EC #	BRENDA	ExPASy	KEGG	MetaCyc
7.6.2.1	↗	↗	↗	↗

Gene location (Human)
Chr.	Chromosome 18 (human)
Band	18q21.31	Start	57,646,426 bp
Band	18q21.31	End	57,803,315 bp

Gene location (Mouse)
Chr.	Chromosome 18 (mouse)
Band	18|18 E1	Start	64,662,038 bp
Band	18|18 E1	End	64,794,338 bp
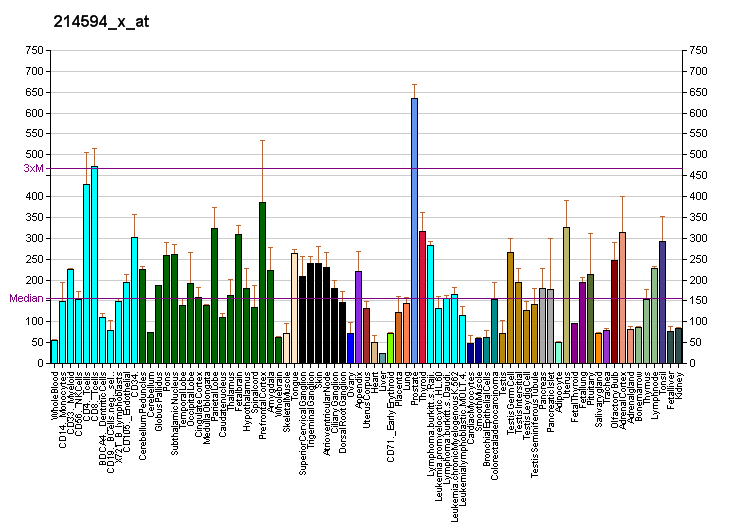
RNA expression pattern
Bgee	Human / Mouse (ortholog); Top expressed in: cardia; nipple; renal medulla; pylorus; ventral tegmental area; trigeminal ganglion; buccal mucosa cell; superior surface of tongue; superior vestibular nucleus; subthalamic nucleus / Top expressed in: epithelium of small intestine; decidua; left colon; epithelium of stomach; transitional epithelium of urinary bladder; jejunum; cervix; ileum; lobe of prostate; islet of Langerhans; More reference expression data
BioGPS	More reference expression data
Gene ontology
Molecular function	nucleotide binding; cardiolipin binding; lipid transporter activity; metal ion binding; protein binding; ATPase-coupled intramembrane lipid transporter activity; hydrolase activity; ATP binding; magnesium ion binding; aminophospholipid flippase activity
Cellular component	integral component of membrane; Golgi apparatus; cell projection; membrane; plasma membrane; integral component of plasma membrane; stereocilium; brush border membrane; apical plasma membrane; endoplasmic reticulum
Biological process	regulation of microvillus assembly; lipid transport; Golgi organization; xenobiotic transmembrane transport; bile acid metabolic process; phospholipid transport; hearing; ion transmembrane transport; inner ear receptor cell development; phospholipid translocation; bile acid and bile salt transport; vestibulocochlear nerve formation; negative regulation of transcription, DNA-templated; aminophospholipid transport
Sources:Amigo / QuickGO
Orthologs
Databases	NCBI: entry; OMA: entry
Species	Human	Mouse
Entrez	5205	54670
Ensembl	ENSG00000081923	ENSMUSG00000039529
UniProt	O43520	Q148W0
RefSeq (mRNA)	NM_005603; NM_001374385; NM_001374386	NM_001001488
RefSeq (protein)	NP_005594	NP_001001488
Location (UCSC)	Chr 18: 57.65 – 57.8 Mb	Chr 18: 64.66 – 64.79 Mb
PubMed search
- Wikidata
View/Edit Human	View/Edit Mouse

Probable phospholipid-transporting ATPase IC is an enzyme that in humans is encoded by the ATP8B1 gene. This protein is associated with progressive familial intrahepatic cholestasis type 1 as well as benign recurrent intrahepatic cholestasis.

== Function ==
This gene encodes a member of the P-type cation transport ATPase family and specifically belongs to the subfamily of aminophospholipid-transporting ATPases. This protein is highly expressed in the small intestine, stomach, pancreas, and prostate and is also found in cholangiocytes and the canalicular membranes of hepatocytes in the liver. The aminophospholipid translocases transport phosphatidylserine and phosphatidylethanolamine from one side of a bilayer to another. Mutations in this gene may result in progressive familial intrahepatic cholestasis type 1 and in benign recurrent intrahepatic cholestasis. Exactly how mutations result in these diseases is not currently understood.
