= Prurigo gestationis =

- Other names: Prurigo gestationis of Besnier, Early-onset prurigo of pregnancy, Linear IgM dermatosis of pregnancy, Papular dermatitis of pregnancy, Prurigo of pregnancy, and Spangler's papular dermatitis of pregnancy
- Specialty: Dermatology

Prurigo gestationis is an eruption consisting of pruritic, excoriated papules of the proximal limbs and upper trunk, most often occurring between the 20th and 34th week of gestation.

The exact etiology is unknown, but it is considered likely to be a flareup of atopic dermatitis during pregnancy.

It is sometimes considered to be a term encompassing Besnier's prurigo gestationis and other conditions.

It is sometimes considered a diagnosis of exclusion.

== See also ==
- Dermatoses of pregnancy
- Ernest Henri Besnier
- List of cutaneous conditions
