= Pruritic urticarial papules and plaques of pregnancy =

Chronic rash that occurs during pregnancy

PUPPP
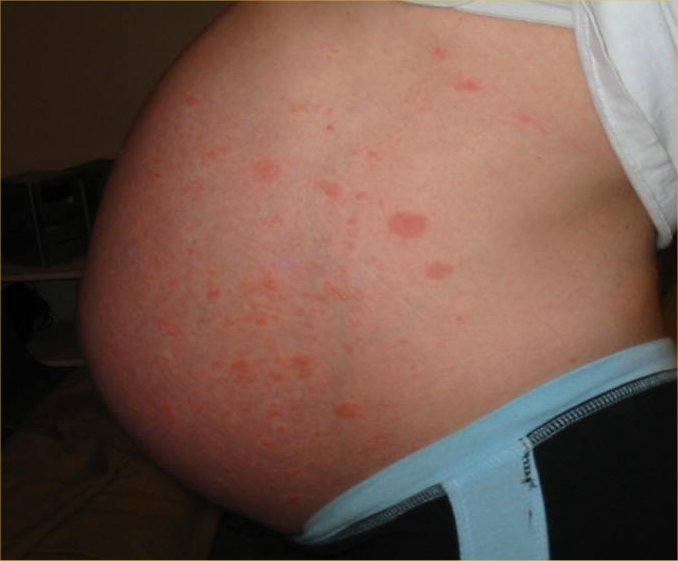
- Left side view of abdomen

Pruritic urticarial papules and plaques of pregnancy (PUPPP), known in the United Kingdom as polymorphic eruption of pregnancy (PEP), is a chronic hives-like rash that strikes some women during pregnancy. Some skin changes are known to occur in people who are pregnant while other skin conditions, or dermatoses, that people have prior to getting pregnant will become altered or symptoms will increase. PUPPP is one of many skin conditions that is specific to pregnancy and occurs in about 1 in every 160 (0.625%) pregnancies.

It presents no long-term risk for either the woman or fetus as there is no statistical increase of risk of premature labor or fetal loss, despite frequently severe pruritus.

PUPPP usually first appears on the abdomen and often spreads to the legs, feet, arms, chest, and neck. The face is usually not affected. Skin distension (stretching) is thought to be a possible trigger for PUPPP as it most commonly affects primigravida (women in their first pregnancy), those with large fundal measurements (distance from the pubic bone to the top of the uterus) and/or those who are carrying large babies or multiples. The papules and plaques often first appear within stretch marks before changing appearance and spreading to other areas of the body.

For those who may be experiencing signs and symptoms of PUPPP, it is strongly recommended they speak with their primary care physician and receive a consult from a dermatologist regarding skin changes during pregnancy.

== Signs and symptoms ==
PUPPP most commonly presents as a rash that starts within the stretch marks. This rash may then move to other areas of the body, including, but not limited to the trunk of the body, arms, legs, feet, chest, and neck. Very few people experiencing PUPPP have reported the rash spreading to the face, palms of hands, or soles of feet.

This rash usually begins with the skin looking abnormally red and feeling itchy, accompanied by notable swelling of skin tissue that appears raised and within the stretch marks. Over time, individual segments of this rash can join to form one whole, larger rash with the same characteristics. As this happens, people report noticing the skin surrounding the rash to appear white in color (blanched) and in the shape of "halos". Multiple features of the disease can continue with time and have been reported as widespread erythema (a red skin rash due to damage of underlying capillaries) and patches of inflamed, itchy, rough, and cracked patches of skin that appear similarly to eczema. Other features have been reported in some cases of those experiencing PUPPP, such as tiny vesicles, however these are not as common and develop after more time.

Some reports have shown there is a positive correlation between PUPPP and excessive maternal weight gain and high newborn birth weight. In one of these, a study from Ghazeeri et al. of 18 cases in Lebanon, all 18 mothers had an Rh-positive blood type, and 50% of the pregnancies were the result of in vitro fertilization (compared to a global IVF rate of 2-5%).

The timeline of onset for these symptoms has been reported with some variability. However, most people report experiencing symptoms during the third trimester (last few weeks of pregnancy) where 15% of the women who have PUPPP reported that symptoms actually began immediately after delivery of the baby. As mentioned above, the papules and plaques usually first appear on the abdomen (although not on the umbilicus/belly button) and often spread to the legs, chest, underarms, etc. However, lesions on or above the breasts are rare. PUPPP causes the skin to become very itchy (pruritic) and often severely affects the patient's sleep quality.

== Cause ==
PUPPP is the most common dermatosis of pregnancy and is most frequent in women carrying a male fetus, women who had quick and conspicuous weight gain during a short period, and women who ultimately deliver via C-section. Although the exact cause of the condition is not known and may vary between individuals, there have been theories linking PUPPP to hormonal alterations, damage to the connective tissue during pregnancy, and autoimmune disorder. The evidence for these theories is currently inconclusive.

This skin condition occurs mostly in first pregnancies (primigravida), in the third trimester and is more likely with multiple pregnancies (more so with triplets than twins or singletons). Occasionally, this condition may also occur postpartum, but rarely does this ever occur in the first and second trimester.

Other than additional associations with hypertension and induction of labour, there are no observed difference in the outcome of the pregnancy for mothers or babies.

=== Dermatological Causes ===
During pregnancy as the abdominal wall rapid stretching, it is hypothesized that there is an inflammatory reaction that occurs due to the exposure of collagen. This reaction has been seen more frequently in those who are having twins or triplets compared to those with single births. This is hypothesized to be due to increased stretching of the abdominal wall while carrying twins or triplets, causing an earlier onset of PUPPP when compared to those undergoing single births.

=== Hormonal Causes ===
Throughout pregnancy, there are hormonal changes that occur where it has been hypothesized that these changes may contribute to the onset of PUPPP. Although current research is low on this hypothesis, it has been seen that those who have had multiple gestations can exhibit an increased level of progesterone. With this increase in progesterone, it causes there to be an increased level of progesterone receptors present eliciting an immune reaction seen by skin lesions in PUPPP. With multiple gestations, there is an increase in sex hormones that has been seen those with the condition such as an increase in progesterone as previously discussed but also higher levels of estradiol. Currently evidence is weak in the role that sex hormones play when contributing to PUPPP where further research is needed.

=== Immunological Causes ===
==== Inflammatory Mediated ====
From those with PUPPP, it has been seen from an immunohistology profile which is used to determine the tissue components present within an individual via the use of antibodies, that there are certain immune cells that are in greater amount compared to that of those without PUPPP. Immunohistology profile have shown cells consistent with a delayed hypersensitivity with T helper cell infiltrates, dendritic cells and epidermal Langerhans cells.

It has been hypothesized that PUPPP appears in response to fetal antigens that circulate throughout the body. For example, a study showed that fetal male DNA was found within the lesions of the mother's skin which was thought to be caused by the fetal cells seen in the mother's blood throughout pregnancy.

==== Autoimmune ====
Although this condition has not been determined as an autoimmune condition, from a single study it has been seen that Immunoglobulin M (IgM) deposition at the dermal-epidermal membrane has been associated with a variety of dermatosis including PUPPP. The problem with the hypothesis that has been proposed is that this condition does not reoccur and it does not progressively worsen. Currently there has been no evidence of detecting circulating antibodies that are associated with the onset on PUPPP in an individual.

== Diagnosis ==
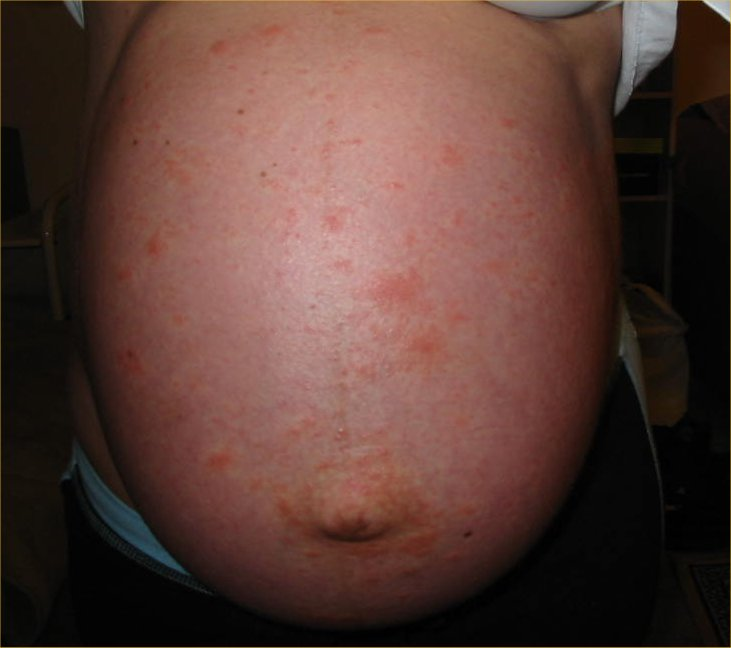
Front view of abdomen

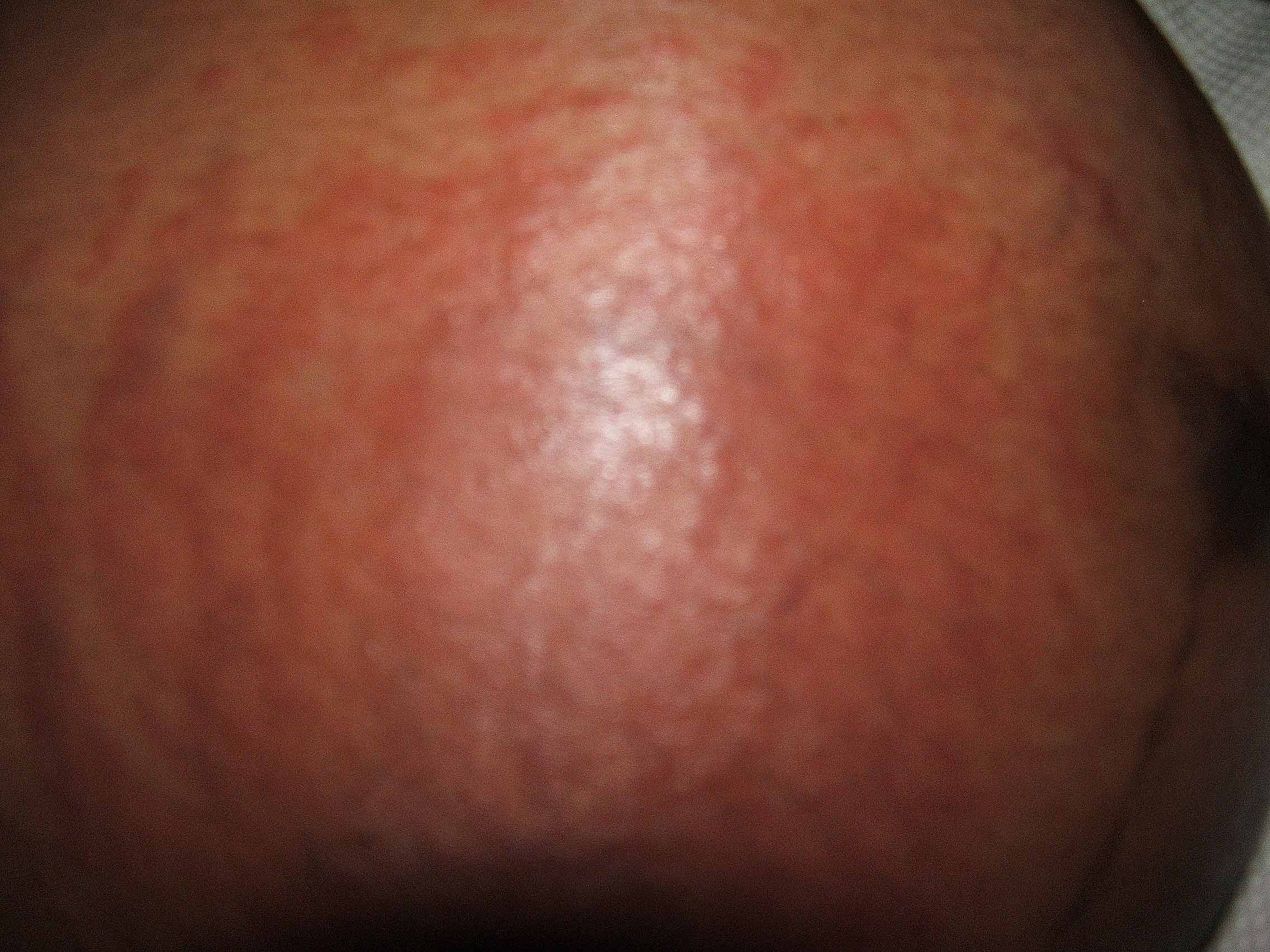
Side view of abdomen

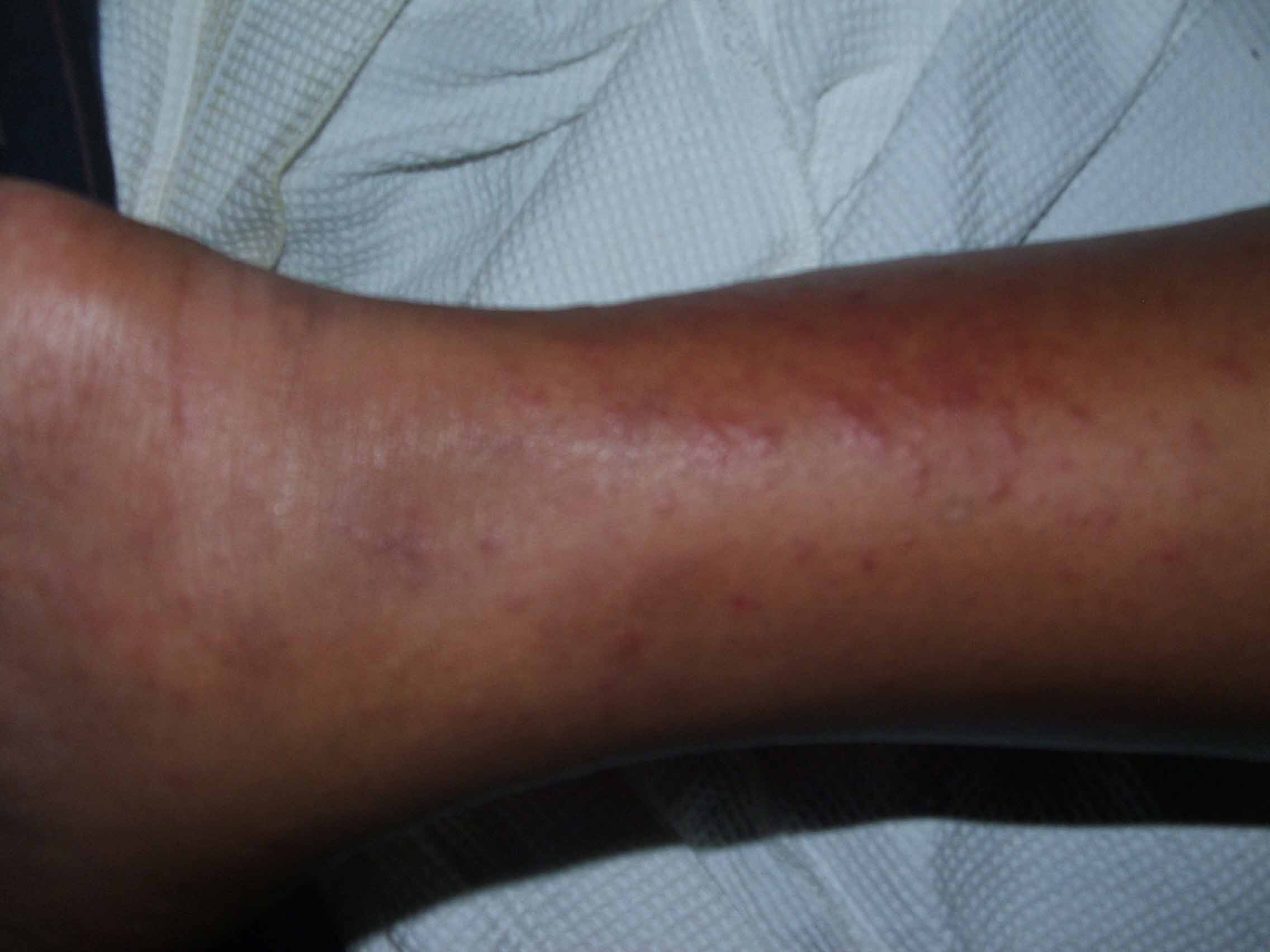
Feet and ankle view

PUPPP is often a diagnosis of exclusion and may need laboratory testing to rule out other dermatoses. Lab tests may include complete blood count, comprehensive metabolic panel, liver function tests, serum human choriogonadotropin and serum cortisol. Additional specialized tests may include serum for indirect immunofluorescence or biopsy of the lesions for direct immunofluorescence to rule out pemphigoid gestationis.

A common misdiagnosis is urticarial pemphigoid gestationis, hence it is needed to exclude it while diagnosing PUPPP as clinical features can overlap. Therefore, histological and immunological studies are necessary to ensure there is no misdiagnosis. During the case of pemphigoid gestationis, lesions usually occur during the earlier periods of gestation and often involve the umbilicus; as well as, having a positive immunofluorescence of perilesional skin. If there is eczema, people generally have a history of atopy, be it personal or through family. The eruption is identified by pruritic erythematous lesions on flexural areas. Furthermore, other clinical differential diagnosis could be from drug eruptions, urticaria, or viral exanthems.

Sometimes, people may require a 3- or 4-mm punch biopsy to exclude herpes gestationis, which is a variant of bullous pemphigoid occurring during or immediately after pregnancy. Usually, the biopsy has features that are consistent with PUPPP but there are no pathognomonic symptoms of the particular disorder. Additionally, a biopsy of unaffected perilesional skin could be used for direct immunofluorescence studies to have a more precise exclusion of herpes gestationis.

== Treatment ==
Diagnosis should be conducted by a trusted medical professional. In the case that a woman is experiencing symptoms of PUPPP, it is recommended that they contact their primary care physician for referral to a dermatologist for treatment guidance and should not self-treat.

In the majority of cases, PUPPP resolves within a few days or weeks upon initial onset or spontaneously within a week of delivery. However, a few women continue to experience symptoms long into the postpartum period.

One of the most recent forms of treatment suggested is the intramuscular injection of autologous whole blood as an alternative treatment option for people affected by PUPPP right after childbirth, as it seems to have both subjective and objective improvements of the symptoms. This is a very good option for the people who are worried about taking medications during pregnancy or breastfeeding

Antihistamine tablets may be prescribed to provide relief from the itch, although they are generally considered much less effective than corticosteroid treatments, and may decrease itching through blocking histamine release as well as improving sleep quality.

Furthermore, first-generation antihistamines, such as chlorpheniramine, have proven to be safe in pregnancy and can be a supplement treatment for pruritus. Second-generation antihistamines such as loratadine and cetirizine are non-sedating and may also be effective in controlling pruritus in pregnant people.

Knowing that oral antihistamines are generally ineffective, high-potency topical steroids are used to treat PUPPP, and ideally tapering it off after 7 days of therapy. Class I or II corticosteroid creams and ointments are used in more aggressive cases, and oral (systemic) corticosteroids can be used to treat very severe cases—although the benefits of a pregnant woman's ingesting high-potency corticosteroids must be weighed carefully against possible (and mostly unknown) risks to the developing fetus or fetuses. The use of high-potency topical corticosteroids over 300 grams throughout the pregnancy may increase the risk of low birth weight for the baby. Rarely, in unusually persistent and distressing cases, some women have had their labor induced as soon as they are considered to be at term (37 weeks).

When the pruritus is unbearable to the patient with PUPPP, oral prednisone in doses of 10 to 40 mg/day has been generally used for these types of severe cases. With this treatment, symptoms are usually relieved after 24 hours of the oral treatment. Sometimes, if the cases are too severe and the symptoms are extremely unbearable, early delivery can be discussed with the patient if the other treatments are ineffective. However, early delivery of the baby still does not guarantee that the symptoms will be gone. Luckily, in most cases, steroid treatment works efficiently and symptoms are generally greatly improved within several days. As with most steroid treatments, the usage of it is a controversial topic. Nonetheless, short-term or one-time use is advisable, and tends to be safer while using it during the third trimester compared to the first trimester.

Pine tar soap/body wash can also bring relief as can keeping the skin chilled such as through a cold shower or iced cloths.

== See also ==
- Intrahepatic cholestasis of pregnancy
- List of cutaneous conditions
