= Simeprevir =

Chemical compound

Clinical data
- Pronunciation: /sɪˈmɛprəvɪər/ si-MEP-rə-veer
- Trade names: Olysio, Sovriad, Galexos, others
- Other names: TMC435; TMC435350
- AHFS/Drugs.com: Monograph
- MedlinePlus: a614013
- License data: EU EMA: by INN; US DailyMed: Simeprevir
- Routes of administration: By mouth
- ATC code: J05AP05 (WHO)

Legal status
- Legal status: AU: S4 (Prescription only); US: ℞-only; In general: ℞ (Prescription only)

Pharmacokinetic data
- Bioavailability: 62% (under fed conditions)
- Protein binding: >99.9%
- Metabolism: Liver (CYP3A, CYP2C8, CYP2C19)
- Elimination half-life: 10–13 hours (HCV-uninfected subjects), 41 hours (HCV-infected subjects)
- Excretion: Feces (91%), urine (<1%)

Identifiers
- IUPAC name: (2R,3aR,10Z,11aS,12aR,14aR)-N-(Cyclopropylsulfonyl)-2-{[2-(4-isopropyl-1,3-thiazol-2-yl)-7-methoxy-8-methyl-4-quinolinyl]oxy}-5-methyl-4,14-dioxo-2,3,3a,4,5,6,7,8,9,11a,12,13,14,14a-tetradecahydrocyclopenta[c]cyclopropa[g][1,6]diazacyclotetradecine-12a(1H)-carboxamide
- CAS Number: 923604-59-5
- PubChem CID: 24873435
- IUPHAR/BPS: 7367
- DrugBank: DB06290
- ChemSpider: 23331536
- UNII: 9WS5RD66HZ
- KEGG: D10081
- ChEMBL: ChEMBL501849
- NIAID ChemDB: 489101
- CompTox Dashboard (EPA): DTXSID20919221
- ECHA InfoCard: 100.215.933

Chemical and physical data
- Formula: C_{38}H_{47}N_{5}O_{7}S_{2}
- Molar mass: 749.94 g·mol^{−1}
- 3D model (JSmol)
- SMILES: Cc1c(ccc2c1nc(cc2O[C@@H]3C[C@@H]4[C@@H](C3)C(=O)N(CCCC/C=C\[C@@H]5C[C@]5(NC4=O)C(=O)NS(=O)(=O)C6CC6)C)c7nc(cs7)C(C)C)OC
- InChI: InChI=1S/C38H47N5O7S2/c1-21(2)30-20-51-35(40-30)29-18-32(26-13-14-31(49-5)22(3)33(26)39-29)50-24-16-27-28(17-24)36(45)43(4)15-9-7-6-8-10-23-19-38(23,41-34(27)44)37(46)42-52(47,48)25-11-12-25/h8,10,13-14,18,20-21,23-25,27-28H,6-7,9,11-12,15-17,19H2,1-5H3,(H,41,44)(H,42,46)/b10-8-/t23-,24-,27-,28-,38-/m1/s1; Key:JTZZSQYMACOLNN-VDWJNHBNSA-N

Simeprevir, sold under the brand name Olysio among others, is a medication used in combination with other medications for the treatment of hepatitis C. It is specifically used for hepatitis C genotype 1 and 4. Medications it is used with include sofosbuvir or ribavirin and peginterferon-alfa. Cure rates are in 80s to 90s percent. It may be used in those who also have HIV/AIDS. It is taken by mouth once daily for typically 12 weeks.

Common side effects include feeling tired, headache, rash, itchiness, and sensitivity to sunlight. In those with previous hepatitis B infection, active disease may recur. It is not recommended in those with significant liver problems. During pregnancy when used with ribavirin it may cause harm to the baby while when used with sofosbuvir its safety is unclear. Simeprevir is a HCV protease inhibitor.

Simeprevir was developed by Medivir AB and Janssen Pharmaceutica. It was approved for medical use in the United States in 2013. It was removed from the World Health Organization's List of Essential Medicines in 2019. It is not available as a generic medication as of 2015.

== Medical use ==
Simeprevir is indicated treating chronic hepatic C (CHC) infection as a part of a triple antiviral treatment regimen consisting of two other drugs: peginterferon-alfa (PEG-IFN) and ribavirin (RBV). It is primarily effective in treating Hepatitis C virus (HCV) genotype 1 infected subjects with compensated liver disease, including cirrhosis. There are currently no studies that show Simeprevir's effectiveness as a single therapy for HCV. Simeprevir is generally used for HCV genotype 1 infected subjects, but off-label medical use has been indicated for type 4 genotype as well.

=== Dosing ===
Simeprevir is dosed along with peg-IFN and RBV as triple therapy. Appropriate dosing of Simeprevir is dependent upon the patient's liver function, kidney function, viral load, and HCV genotype. This medication is not recommended for people with moderate or severe liver impairment and people with end-stage kidney disease since Simprevir was not studied for use in these patient populations. Simeprevir might be discontinued depending on their viral load. For instance, if the patient's viral load is detectable (>25 units/mL) during the 4th week of their treatment regimen, it is considered an inadequate treatment and simeprevir must be discontinued.

== Contraindications ==
Any contraindications that apply to peg-IFN and RBV apply to simeprevir since they must be used in combination during treatment of CHC. For example, people with sickle cell anemia are contraindicated to RBV therapy and are therefore contraindicated to simeprevir and peg-IFN combination therapy. Pregnant women and men whose female partners are pregnant are contraindicated for simeprevir since peg-IFN and RBV are known to cause birth defects.

=== Pregnancy ===
Simeprevir is avoided in pregnant women or women planning to be pregnant because it going to be taken with RBV and Peg-IFN, which have both shown to cause fetal problems in animal studies. RBV has been shown to cause birth defects and fetal deaths in animal studies. Peg-IFN has been shown to cause abortions in animal studies. People must have a negative pregnancy test prior to starting therapy, use at least two effective birth control methods during treatment, and undergo monthly pregnancy tests. If pregnant women are exposed to any medication regimen containing ribavirin, they are encouraged to report this through the ribavirin pregnancy registry.

== Adverse effects ==
Severe itching (22%), sensitivity to sunlight (5%), and rash (25%) are some of the common adverse effects of simeprevir. Other side effects may include nausea, muscle pain, difficulty breathing and increased bilirubin. It may reactivate hepatitis B in those who have been previously infected. The European Medicines Agency (EMA) has recommended screening all people for hepatitis B before starting simeprevir for hepatitis C in order to minimize the risk of hepatitis B reactivation.

=== Combination treatment ===
In March 2015, Gilead Sciences e-mailed warnings to health care providers about nine people that began taking its hepatitis C drugs ledipasvir/sofosbuvir or sofosbuvir along with amiodarone, daclatasvir, or simeprevir developed abnormally slow heartbeats and one died of cardiac arrest. Three required a pacemaker to be inserted. Gilead said the combinations aren't recommended and product labels will be updated.

== Mechanism of action ==
Like some other aminocyclopropanes, simeprevir is a hepatitis C virus protease inhibitor.

Simeprevir is a NS3/4A protease inhibitor, thus preventing viral maturation through inhibition of protein synthesis. Simeprevir is administered as one capsule once daily with pegylated interferon and ribavirin for the treatment of genotype 1 or genotype 4 chronic hepatitis C in adult people with compensated liver disease (including cirrhosis), with or without HIV-1 co-infection, who are treatment naive or who have failed previous interferon therapy. Genotype 1 is the most prevalent form of hepatitis C virus (HCV) worldwide.

== Pharmacokinetics ==
Simeprevir is orally bioavailable. Its absorption increases when taken with food, and is therefore advised to be taken with food. The liver's CYP3A4 enzymes mainly break down simeprevir, but CYP2C8 and CYP2C19 enzymes can also play a role. Its half-life in the plasma is 41 hours in people with HCV. Its peak effect happens 4 to 6 hours after taking the medication. It is primarily excreted into the feces (91%).

== Pharmacogenomics ==
According to simeprevir's prescriber information, its efficacy in combination with peginterferon alfa and ribavirin is "substantially reduced in people with HCV genotype 1a with an NS3 Q80K polymorphism at baseline compared to people infected with HCV genotype 1a without Q80K polymorphism." People with Q80K polymorphism are not advised to take simeprevir.

== Drug interactions ==
Simeprevir is a CYP3A4 substrate so its plasma concentration will significantly increase if taken with medications that are strong CYP3A4 inhibitors (i.e. erythromycin, ritonavir) and will significantly decrease if taken with strong CYP3A4 inducers (i.e. efavirenz, rifampin, Saint John's wort). Simeprevir also inhibits intestinal (but not liver) CYP3A. For instance, midazolam, an anticonvulsant, gets metabolized by intestinal CYP3As and taking it with simeprevir can lead to increased midazolam levels that can be toxic. Simeprevir also inhibits OATP1B1/3 and P-glycoprotein (P-gp) transporters, which are normally transporters that pump out drug out of the plasma. Thus, taking simeprevir with medications that are substrates for these transporters can lead to increased plasma concentrations of these medications. For example, calcium channel blockers (i.e. diltiazem, amlodipine) are P-gp substrates and can lead to increased concentrations of these drugs when taken with simeprevir. Taking ciclosporin, a substrate for OATP1B1/3, with simeprevir resulted in significant increase in ciclosporin concentration and are therefore not recommended to be taken together.

== Approval ==
In the United States, it is approved by the Food and Drug Administration (FDA) for use in combination with peginterferon-alfa and ribavirin for hepatitis C. Simeprevir has been approved in Japan for the treatment of chronic hepatitis C infection, genotype 1.

== Clinical study ==
Simeprevir has been tested in combination regimens with pegylated interferon alfa-2a and ribavirin, and in interferon-free regimens with other direct-acting antiviral agents including daclatasvir and sofosbuvir.

Results from three phase 3 randomized, double-blind, placebo controlled clinical trials (C208, C216, and HPC3007) in people with chronic HCV GT1 were favourable and resulted in FDA supporting the approval of simeprevir for Hepatitis C genotype 1. Members of the FDA commented following a presentation by Johnson & Johnson (24 October 2013) that post-marketing studies in racial and ethnic minorities, people co-infected with HIV, and other underrepresented populations are needed.

== SARS-CoV-2 research ==
Several studies have been testing if the virostatic mechanism of FDA approved direct acting agents, including simeprevir in combination with remdesivir (relevant drug during the Ebola epidemic 2014–2016), could be of use in the fight against the global pandemic of Sars-Cov-2. Paritaprevir, another molecule used to treat Hepatitis type C, also showed promising results in terms of binding energy and stability of the complex formed.

The advantage of working with such compounds is that they are already FDA approved antivirals, which means that clinical trial phases can be initiated more quickly. The speed of medical response is a critical factor influencing the global consequences of the pandemic; the faster antidotes such as drugs and/ or vaccines are available on a large scale, the more promising is the containment of the disease and its (economic) consequences. Speed is a crucial factor, especially regarding the fight of viruses, which by nature have an extremely high mutation rate.

For SARS-CoV-2, simeprevir acts by inhibiting Main protease (Mpro) and RNA-dependent RNA polymerase, a non-structural protein, essential for viral RNA synthesis.

Mpro belongs to the same enzyme class as NS3/4A, the serine proteases. It cleaves the translated polyprotein to form proteins elemental to viral transcription and replication. Remdesivir alone only inhibits the polymerase itself; in order to stop viral synthesis, an approved hepatitis C drug is also administered to stop the spread of the virus.

In vitro, the viral infection of Sars-CoV-2 could be stopped, and in addition it could be observed that further proteases of the virus are inhibited, and the effect of the antiviral could thus be enhanced. In this regard, clinical studies proving the efficiency on the organism are still lacking at present, which are required before using the drug combination on a large scale as a form of therapy against a Sars-CoV-2 infection.

The hepatitis drugs are considered potential inhibitors of SARS-CoV-2 Mpro in the fight against COVID-19 infection, and the binding affinity and its mechanism, as well as the stability of the complexes formed this way, may serve as a guideline or even template when it comes to designing inhibitors that specifically target this virus. The compounds themselves may also play an important role and shall be studied further in clinical trials.
