= Siddiqur Rahman (Brahmanbaria politician) =

Bangladeshi politician

Member of Bangladesh Parliament
- In office February 1996 – June 2001
- Preceded by: Kazi Md. Anowar Hossain
- Succeeded by: Abdul Latif

Personal details
- Party: Bangladesh Nationalist Party

Siddiqur Rahman is a Bangladesh Nationalist Party politician and a former member of parliament from Brahmanbaria-5.

== Career ==
Rahman was the Cabinet Secretary of Bangladesh from 1991 to 1992.

Rahman was elected to parliament from Brahmanbaria-5 as a Bangladesh Nationalist Party candidate in February 1996.
