= Hepatitis C =

Human viral infection

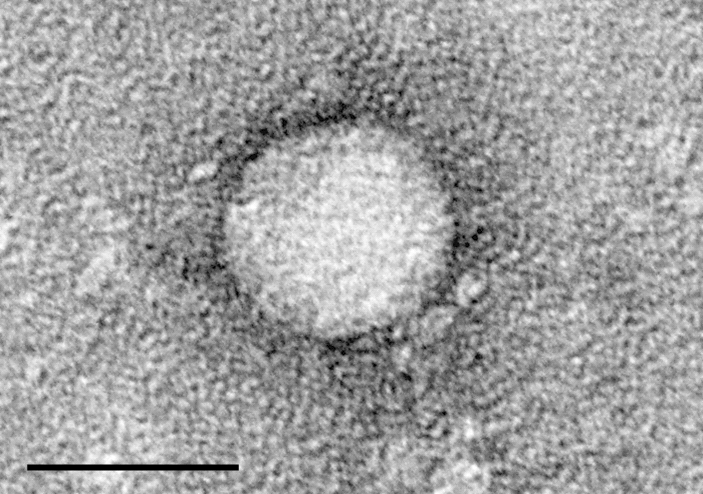
- Electron micrograph of hepatitis C virus from cell culture (scale = 50 nanometers)
- Specialty: Gastroenterology, infectious disease
- Symptoms: Typically none
- Complications: Liver failure, liver cancer, esophageal and gastric varices
- Duration: Long term (80%)
- Causes: Hepatitis C virus usually spread by blood-to-blood contact
- Diagnostic method: Blood testing for antibodies or viral RNA
- Prevention: Sterile needles, testing donated blood
- Treatment: Medications, liver transplant
- Medication: Antivirals (sofosbuvir, simeprevir, others)
- Frequency: 58 million (2019)
- Deaths: 290,000 (2019)

Hepatitis C is an infectious disease caused by the hepatitis C virus (HCV) that primarily affects the liver; it is a type of viral hepatitis. During the initial infection period, people often have mild or no symptoms. Early symptoms can include fever, dark urine, abdominal pain, and jaundice. The virus persists in the liver, becoming chronic in about 70% of those initially infected. Early on, chronic infection typically has no symptoms. Over many years, however, it often leads to liver disease and occasionally cirrhosis. In some cases, those with cirrhosis will develop serious complications such as liver failure, liver cancer, or dilated blood vessels in the esophagus and stomach.

It is spread primarily by blood-to-blood contact associated with injection drug use, poorly sterilized medical equipment, needlestick injuries in healthcare, and transfusions. In regions where blood screening has been implemented, the risk of contracting HCV from a transfusion has dropped substantially to less than one per two million. HCV may also be spread from an infected mother to her baby during birth. It is not spread through breast milk, food, water, or casual contact such as hugging, kissing, and sharing food or drinks with an infected person. It is one of five known hepatitis viruses: A, B, C, D, and E. Diagnosis is by blood testing to look for either antibodies to the virus or viral RNA. In the United States, screening for HCV infection is recommended in all adults age 18 to 79 years old.

There is no vaccine against hepatitis C. Prevention includes harm reduction efforts among people who inject drugs, testing donated blood, and treatment of people with chronic infection. Chronic infection can be cured more than 95% of the time with antiviral medications such as sofosbuvir or simeprevir. Peginterferon and ribavirin were earlier generation treatments that proved successful in <50% of cases and caused greater side effects. While access to the newer treatments was expensive, by 2022 prices had dropped dramatically in many countries (primarily low-income and lower-middle-income countries) due to the introduction of generic versions of medicines. Those who develop cirrhosis or liver cancer may require a liver transplant. Hepatitis C is one of the leading reasons for liver transplantation. However, the virus usually recurs after transplantation.

An estimated 58 million people worldwide were infected with hepatitis C in 2019. Approximately 290,000 deaths from the virus, mainly from liver cancer and cirrhosis attributed to hepatitis C, also occurred in 2019. The existence of hepatitis C – originally identifiable only as a type of non-A, non-B hepatitis – was suggested in the 1970s and proven in 1989. Hepatitis C infects only humans and chimpanzees.

Video summary (script)

== Signs and symptoms ==
=== Acute infection ===
Acute symptoms develop in some 20% of those infected. When this occurs, it is generally 4–12 weeks following infection (but it may take from 2 weeks to 6 months for acute symptoms to appear).

Symptoms are generally mild and vague, and may include fatigue, nausea and vomiting, fever, muscle or joint pains, abdominal pain, decreased appetite and weight loss, jaundice (occurs in ~25% of those infected), dark urine, and clay-coloured stools. Acute liver failure due to acute hepatitis C is exceedingly rare. Symptoms and laboratory findings suggestive of liver disease should prompt further tests and can thus help establish a diagnosis of hepatitis C infection early on.

Following the acute phase, the infection may resolve spontaneously in 10–50% of affected people; this occurs more frequently in young people and females.

=== Chronic infection ===
About 70% of those exposed to the virus develop a chronic infection. This is defined as the presence of detectable viral replication for at least six months. Though most experience minimal or no symptoms during the initial few decades of a chronic infection, chronic hepatitis C can be associated with fatigue and mild cognitive problems. After several years, chronic infection may cause cirrhosis or liver cancer. The liver enzymes measured from blood samples are normal in 7–53%. (Elevated levels indicate the virus or other disease is damaging liver cells). Late relapses after apparent cure have been reported, but these can be difficult to distinguish from reinfection.

Fatty changes to the liver occur in about half of those infected and are usually present before cirrhosis develops. Usually (80% of the time) this change affects less than a third of the liver. Worldwide hepatitis C is the cause of 27% of cirrhosis cases and 25% of hepatocellular carcinoma. About 10–30% of those infected develop cirrhosis over 30 years. Cirrhosis is more common in those also infected with hepatitis B, schistosoma, or HIV, in alcoholics, and in those of male sex. In those with hepatitis C, excess alcohol increases the risk of developing cirrhosis 5-fold. Those who develop cirrhosis have a 20-fold greater risk of hepatocellular carcinoma. This transformation occurs at a rate of 1–3% per year. Being infected with hepatitis B in addition to hepatitis C increases this risk further.

Liver cirrhosis may lead to portal hypertension, ascites (accumulation of fluid in the abdomen), easy bruising or bleeding, varices (enlarged veins, especially in the stomach and esophagus), jaundice, and a syndrome of cognitive impairment known as hepatic encephalopathy. Ascites occurs at some stage in more than half of those who have a chronic infection.

=== Extrahepatic complications ===
The most common problem due to hepatitis C but not involving the liver is mixed cryoglobulinemia (usually the type II form) – an inflammation of small and medium-sized blood vessels. Hepatitis C is also associated with autoimmune disorders such as Sjögren's syndrome, lichen planus, a low platelet count, porphyria cutanea tarda, necrolytic acral erythema, insulin resistance, diabetes mellitus, diabetic nephropathy, autoimmune thyroiditis, and B-cell lymphoproliferative disorders. 20–30% of people infected have rheumatoid factor – a type of antibody. Possible associations include Hyde's prurigo nodularis and membranoproliferative glomerulonephritis. Cardiomyopathy with associated abnormal heart rhythms has also been reported. A variety of central and peripheral nervous system disorders has been reported. Chronic infection seems to be associated with an increased risk of pancreatic cancer. People may experience other issues in the mouth such as dryness, salivary duct stones, and crusted lesions around the mouth.

=== Occult infection ===
People who have been infected with hepatitis C may appear to clear the virus but remain infected. The virus is not detectable with conventional testing but can be found with ultra-sensitive tests. The original method of detection was by demonstrating the viral genome within liver biopsies. Still, newer methods include an antibody test for the virus' core protein and the detection of the viral genome after first concentrating the viral particles by ultracentrifugation. A form of infection with persistently moderately elevated serum liver enzymes but without antibodies to hepatitis C has also been reported. This form is known as cryptogenic occult infection.

Several clinical pictures have been associated with this type of infection. It may be found in people with anti-hepatitis-C antibodies but with normal serum levels of liver enzymes; in antibody-negative people with ongoing elevated liver enzymes of unknown cause; in healthy populations without evidence of liver disease; and in groups at risk for HCV infection including those on hemodialysis or family members of people with occult HCV. The clinical relevance of this form of infection is under investigation. The consequences of occult infection appear to be less severe than with chronic infection but can vary from minimal to hepatocellular carcinoma.

The rate of occult infection in those apparently cured is controversial but appears to be low. 40% of those with hepatitis but with both negative hepatitis C serology and the absence of detectable viral genome in the serum have hepatitis C virus in the liver on biopsy. How commonly this occurs in children is unknown.

== Cause ==
=== Virology ===
The hepatitis C virus (HCV) is a small, enveloped, single-stranded, positive-sense RNA virus. It is a member of the genus Orthohepacivirus in the family Hepacivirus. There are seven major genotypes of HCV, which are known as genotypes one to seven. The genotypes are divided into several subtypes with the number of subtypes depending on the genotype. In the United States, about 70% of cases are caused by genotype 1, 20% by genotype 2, and about 1% by each of the other genotypes. Genotype 1 is also the most common in South America and Europe.

The half-life of the virus particles in the serum is around 3 hours and may be as short as 45 minutes. In an infected person, about 10^{12} virus particles are produced each day. In addition to replicating in the liver the virus can multiply in lymphocytes.

=== Transmission ===
Hepatitis C infection in the United States by source

Percutaneous contact with contaminated blood is responsible for most infections; however, the method of transmission is strongly dependent on both geographic region and economic status. Indeed, the primary route of transmission in the developed world is injection drug use, while in the developing world the main methods are blood transfusions and unsafe medical procedures. The cause of transmission remains unknown in 20% of cases; however, many of these are believed to be accounted for by injection drug use.

HCV is not spread through casual contact, such as hugging, kissing, or sharing eating or cooking utensils, nor is it transmitted through food or water.

==== Drug use ====
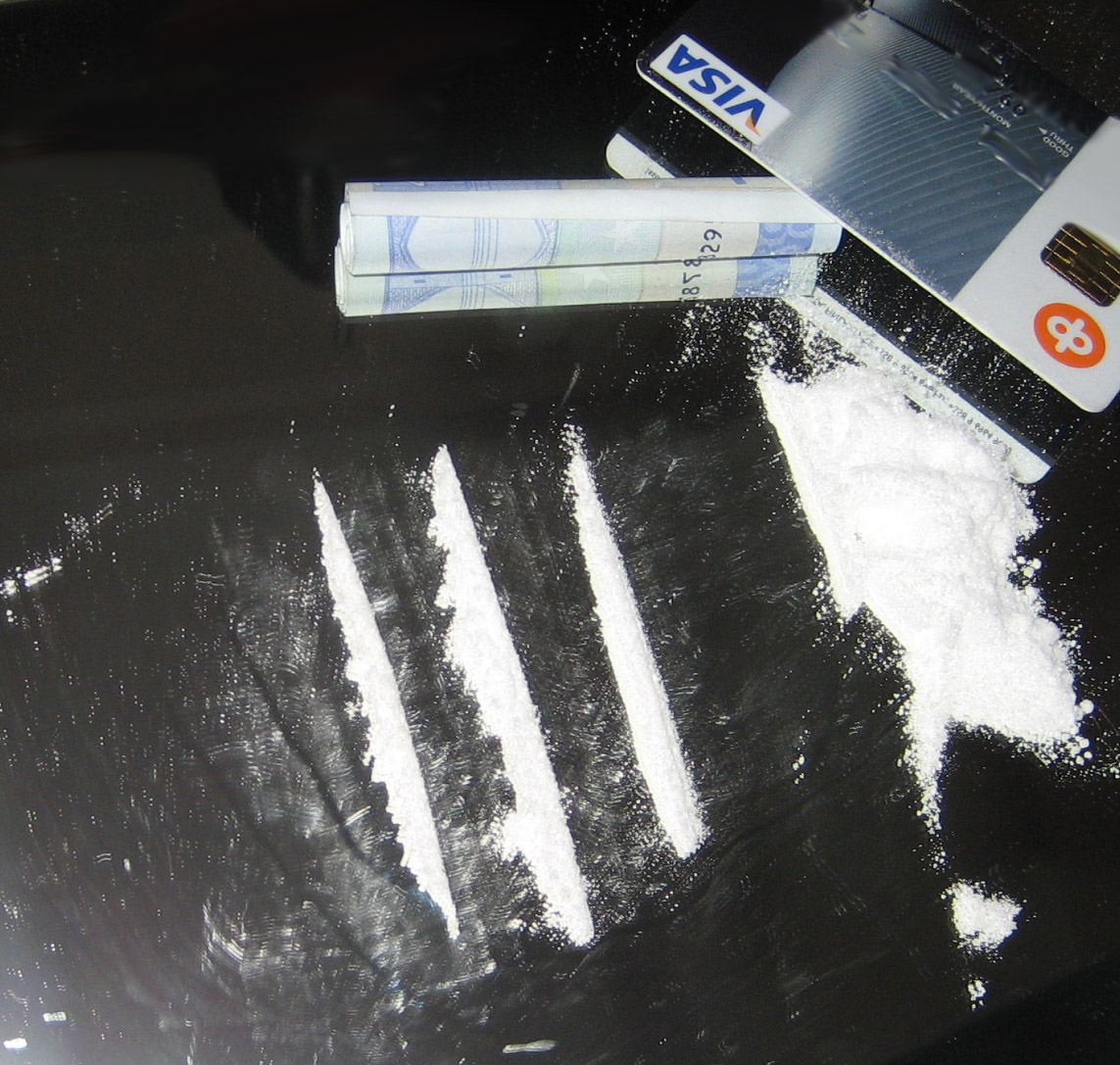
Lines of cocaine prepared for snorting. Contaminated currency such as banknotes might serve as a fomite of diseases like hepatitis C

Injection drug use (IDU) is a major risk factor for hepatitis C in many parts of the world. Of 77 countries reviewed, 25 (including the United States) were found to have a prevalence of hepatitis C of 60–80% among people who use injection drugs. Twelve countries had rates greater than 80%. It is believed that ten million people who use drugs intravenously are infected with hepatitis C; China (1.6 million), the United States (1.5 million), and Russia (1.3 million) have the highest absolute totals.

Occurrence of hepatitis C among prison inmates in the United States is 10 to 20 times that of the occurrence observed in the general population; this has been attributed to high-risk behavior in prisons such as IDU and tattooing with non-sterile equipment. Shared intranasal drug use may also be a risk factor.

==== Healthcare exposure ====
Blood transfusion, transfusion of blood products, or organ transplants without HCV screening carry significant risks of infection. The United States instituted universal screening in 1992, and Canada instituted universal screening in 1990. This decreased the risk from one in 200 units to between one in 10,000 to one in 10,000,000 per unit of blood. This low risk remains as there is about 11–70 days between the potential blood donor's acquiring hepatitis C and the blood's testing positive, depending on the method. Some countries do not screen for hepatitis C due to the cost.

Those who have experienced a needle stick injury from someone who was HCV positive have about a 1.8% chance of subsequently contracting the disease themselves. The risk is greater if the needle is hollow and the puncture wound is deep. There is a risk from mucosal exposure to blood, but this risk is low, and there is no risk if blood exposure occurs on intact skin.

Hospital equipment has also been documented as a method of transmission of hepatitis C, including the reuse of needles and syringes, multiple-use medication vials, infusion bags, and improperly sterilized surgical equipment, among others. Limitations in the implementation and enforcement of stringent standard precautions in public and private medical and dental facilities are known to have been the primary cause of the spread of HCV in Egypt, the country which had the highest rate of infection in the world in 2012. In 2023, Egypt became the first country to achieve WHO validation on the path to elimination of hepatitis C.

==== Sex ====
Sexual intercourse is not the most common mode of transmission of hepatitis C, and the rate of transmission varies between different groups. Studies examining the risk of HCV transmission between heterosexual partners, when one is infected and the other is not, have found very low risks. Research has found higher rates of sexually transmitted HCV among people with multiple partners, and men who have sex with men at the highest risk of sexual transmission. Sexual practices that involve higher levels of trauma to the anogenital mucosa, such as anal penetrative sex, or that occur when there is a concurrent sexually transmitted infection, including HIV or genital ulceration, present greater risks. The United States Department of Veterans Affairs recommends condom use to prevent hepatitis C transmission in those with multiple partners, but not those in relationships that involve only a single partner.

==== Body modification ====
Tattooing is associated with two- to threefold increased risk of hepatitis C. This could be due to improperly sterilized equipment or contamination of the dyes used. Tattoos or piercings performed either before the mid-1980s, "underground", or nonprofessionally are of particular concern, since sterile techniques in such settings may be lacking. The risk also appears to be greater for larger tattoos. It is estimated that nearly half of prison inmates share unsterilized tattooing equipment. It is rare for tattoos in a licensed facility to be directly associated with HCV infection.

==== Mother-to-child ====
Mother-to-child transmission of hepatitis C occurs in fewer than 10% of pregnancies. There are no measures that alter this risk. It is not clear when transmission occurs during pregnancy, but it may occur both during gestation and at delivery. A long labor is associated with a greater risk of transmission. There is no evidence that breastfeeding spreads HCV; however, to be cautious, an infected mother is advised to avoid breastfeeding if her nipples are cracked and bleeding, or if her viral loads are high.

==== Fomites ====
A fomite (/ˈfoʊmaɪt/) or fomes (/ˈfoʊmiːz/) is any inanimate object that, when contaminated with or exposed to infectious agents (such as pathogenic bacteria, viruses or fungi), can transfer disease to a new host.

Personal-care items such as razors, toothbrushes, and manicuring or pedicuring equipment can be contaminated with blood. Sharing such items can potentially lead to exposure to HCV. Appropriate caution should be taken regarding any medical condition that results in bleeding, such as cuts and sores.

== Diagnosis ==
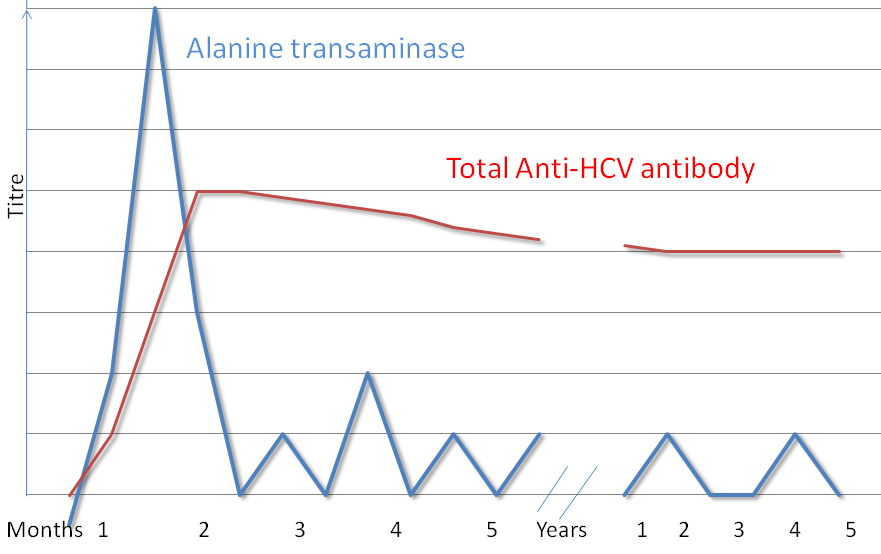
Serologic profile of hepatitis C infection

There are several diagnostic tests for hepatitis C, including HCV antibody enzyme immunoassay (ELISA), recombinant immunoblot assay, and quantitative HCV RNA polymerase chain reaction (PCR). HCV RNA can be detected by PCR typically one to two weeks after infection. In contrast, antibodies can take substantially longer to form and thus be detected.

Diagnosing patients is generally a challenge as patients with acute illness often present with mild, non-specific flu-like symptoms, while the transition from acute to chronic is sub-clinical. Chronic hepatitis C is defined as infection with the hepatitis C virus persisting for more than six months based on the presence of its RNA. Chronic infections are typically asymptomatic during the first few decades, and thus are most commonly discovered following the investigation of elevated liver enzyme levels or during a routine screening of high-risk individuals. Testing is not able to distinguish between acute and chronic infections. Diagnosis in infants is difficult as maternal antibodies may persist for up to 18 months.

=== Serology ===
Hepatitis C testing typically begins with blood testing to detect the presence of antibodies to the HCV, using an enzyme immunoassay. If this test is positive, a confirmatory test is then performed to verify the immunoassay and to determine the viral load. A recombinant immunoblot assay is used to verify the immunoassay, and the viral load is determined by an HCV RNA polymerase chain reaction. If there is no RNA and the immunoblot is positive, it means that the person tested had a previous infection but cleared it either with treatment or spontaneously; if the immunoblot is negative, it means that the immunoassay was wrong. It takes about 6–8 weeks following infection before the immunoassay will test positive. Several tests are available as point-of-care testing (POCT), which can provide results within 30 minutes.

Liver enzymes are variable during the initial part of the infection and on average begin to rise seven weeks after infection. The elevation of liver enzymes does not closely follow disease severity.

=== Biopsy ===
Liver biopsies are used to determine the degree of liver damage present; however, there are risks from the procedure. The typical changes seen are lymphocytes within the parenchyma, lymphoid follicles in portal triad, and changes to the bile ducts. There are many blood tests available that try to determine the degree of hepatic fibrosis and alleviate the need for biopsy.

=== Screening ===
It is believed that only 5–50% of those infected in the United States and Canada are aware of their status. Routine screening for those between the ages of 18 and 79 was recommended by the United States Preventive Services Task Force in 2020. Previously, testing was recommended for those at high risk, including injection drug users, those who have received blood transfusions before 1992, those who have been incarcerated, those on long-term hemodialysis, and those with tattoos. Screening is also recommended for those with elevated liver enzymes, as this is frequently the only sign of chronic hepatitis. As of 2012, the U.S. Centers for Disease Control and Prevention (CDC) recommends a single screening test for those born between 1945 and 1965. In Canada, a one-time screening is recommended for those born between 1945 and 1975.

== Prevention ==
As of 2022, no approved vaccine protects against contracting hepatitis C. A combination of harm reduction strategies, such as the provision of new needles and syringes and treatment of substance use, decreases the risk of hepatitis C in people using injection drugs by about 75%. The screening of blood donors is important at a national level, as is adhering to universal precautions within healthcare facilities. In countries where there is an insufficient supply of sterile syringes, medications should be given orally rather than via injection (when possible). Recent research also suggests that treating people with active infection, thereby reducing the potential for transmission, may be an effective preventive measure.

Hepatitis C vaccine phase 1 clinical trials are set to begin in the summer of 2023.

== Treatment ==
Those with chronic hepatitis C are advised to avoid alcohol and medications that are toxic to the liver. They should also be vaccinated against hepatitis A and hepatitis B due to the increased risk if also infected. Use of acetaminophen is generally considered safe at reduced doses. Nonsteroidal anti-inflammatory drugs (NSAIDs) are not recommended in those with advanced liver disease due to an increased risk of bleeding. Ultrasound surveillance for hepatocellular carcinoma is recommended in those with accompanying cirrhosis. Regular, moderate coffee consumption, especially caffeinated, has been associated with a slower rate of liver scarring in those infected with HCV.

=== Medications ===
Ribavirin

Hepatitis C is treated with direct-acting antiviral medications. The specific treatment used depends on virus genotype, presence and severity of cirrhosis, previous treatment for hepatitis C, and co-infection with other infectious diseases, including HIV and other hepatitis viruses. Typical treatment courses range from 8 weeks to 16 weeks.

Antiviral medications are given in fixed-dose combinations in the treatment of hepatitis C. In adults who have not been previously treated and have no complications, either glecaprevir/pibrentasvir or sofosbuvir/velpatasvir are used; they have activity against all genotypes of HCV. In those with compensated cirrhosis, testing for genotype 3 and antiviral resistance is completed before sofosbuvir/velpatasvir is used. Alternatively, glecaprevir/pibrentasvir is used for treatment. In those with decompensated cirrhosis, ribavirin is added to either sofosbuvir/velpatasvir (used in all genotypes), or ledipasvir/sofosbuvir (genotypes 1, 4, 5, and 6).

More than 95% of people with chronic infection can be cured when treated with medications; however, there is some evidence to suggest that certain genotypes may be associated with lower levels of cure. Additionally, treatment costs may be cost prohibitive in certain settings, especially for GLE/PIB and SOF/VEL/VOX. However, generic versions of SOF/DAC and SOF/VEL are available at lower, more accessible prices. The combination of sofosbuvir, velpatasvir, and voxilaprevir may be used in those who have previously been treated with sofosbuvir or other drugs that inhibit NS5A and were not cured.

Before 2011, treatments consisted of a combination of pegylated interferon alpha and ribavirin for a period of 24 or 48 weeks, depending on HCV genotype. This treatment produces cure rates of 70–80% for genotype 2 and 3, respectively, and 45–70% for genotypes 1 and 4. Adverse effects with these treatments were common, with 50–60% of those being treated experiencing flu-like symptoms and nearly a third experiencing depression or other emotional issues. Treatment during the first six months of infection (the acute stage) is more effective than when hepatitis C has entered the chronic stage. In those with chronic hepatitis B, treatment for hepatitis C results in reactivation of hepatitis B about 25% of the time.

=== Liver transplant ===
Cirrhosis due to hepatitis C remains an indication for liver transplantation, though the proportion of liver transplant candidates referred for hepatitis C has decreased since the introduction of direct acting antivirals. As of 2012 in the United States, hepatitis C-related cirrhosis accounted for 33% of liver transplant candidates; by 2023 this proportion was 6.2%.

=== Alternative medicine ===
Several alternative therapies are claimed by their proponents to be helpful for hepatitis C, including milk thistle, ginseng, and colloidal silver. However, no alternative therapy has been shown to improve outcomes for hepatitis C patients, and no evidence exists that alternative therapies have any effect on the virus.

== Prognosis ==
Disability-adjusted life year for hepatitis C in 2004 per 100,000 inhabitants: no data <10 10–15 15–20 20–25 25–30 30–35 / 35–40 40–45 45–50 50–75 75–100 >100

The response to treatment is measured by sustained viral response (SVR), defined as the absence of detectable RNA of the hepatitis C virus in blood serum for at least 24 weeks after discontinuing treatment, and rapid virological response (RVR), defined as undetectable levels achieved within four weeks of treatment. Successful treatment decreases the future risk of hepatocellular carcinoma by 75%.

Before 2012, sustained response occurred in about 40–50% of those with HCV genotype 1 who received 48 weeks of treatment. A sustained response was seen in 70–80% of people with HCV genotypes 2 and 3 following 24 weeks of treatment. A sustained response occurs for about 65% of those with genotype 4 after 48 weeks of treatment. For those with HCV genotype 6, a 48-week treatment protocol of pegylated interferon and ribavirin results in a higher rate of sustained responses than for genotype 1 (86% vs. 52%). Further studies are needed to determine results for shorter 24-week treatments and those given at lower dosages.

=== Spontaneous resolution ===
Around 30% (15–45%) of those with acute HCV infections will spontaneously clear the virus within six months before the infection is considered chronic. Spontaneous resolution following acute infection appears more common in females and younger patients and may be influenced by certain genetic factors. Chronic HCV infection may also resolve spontaneously months or years after the acute phase has passed, though this is unusual.

== Epidemiology ==
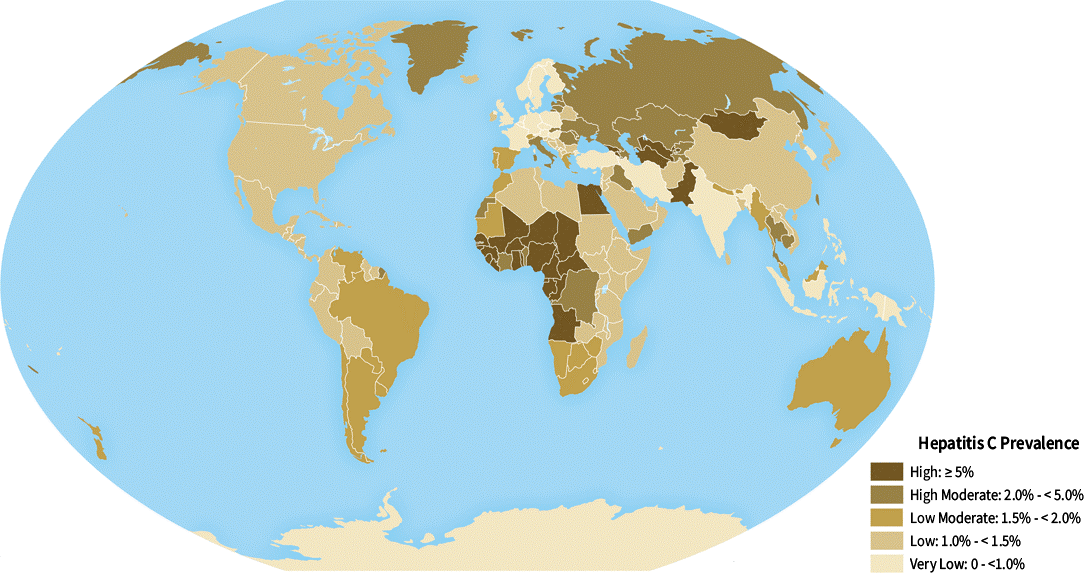
Percentage of people infected with hepatitis C by country in 2019

Number of deaths due to hepatitis C in each country

The World Health Organization estimated in a 2024 report that 50 million people globally were living with chronic hepatitis C as of 2019. About 1.0 million people are infected per year, and about 242,000 people die yearly from hepatitis C–related diseases, mainly from liver cancer and cirrhosis.

Hepatitis C infection rates increased substantially in the 20th century due to a combination of injection drug use and the reuse of poorly sterilized medical equipment. However, advancements in treatment have led to notable declines in chronic infections and deaths from the virus. As a result, the number of chronic patients receiving treatment worldwide has grown from about 950,000 in 2015 to 9.4 million in 2019. During the same period, hepatitis C deaths declined from about 400,000 to 290,000.

Previously, a 2013 study found high infection rates (>3.5% population infected) in Central and East Asia, North Africa and the Middle East, intermediate infection rates (1.5–3.5%) in South and Southeast Asia, sub-Saharan Africa, Andean, Central and Southern Latin America, Caribbean, Oceania, Australasia and Central, Eastern and Western Europe; and low infection rates (<1.5%) in Asia-Pacific, Tropical Latin America and North America.

Among those chronically infected, the risk of cirrhosis after 20 years varies between studies but has been estimated at ~10–15% for men and ~1–5% for women. The reason for this difference is not known. Once cirrhosis is established, the rate of developing hepatocellular carcinoma is ~1–4% per year. Rates of new infections have decreased in the Western world since the 1990s due to improved screening of blood before transfusion.

In Egypt, following Egypt's 2030 Vision, the country managed to bring down the infection rates of hepatitis C from 22% in 2011 to just 2% in 2021. It was believed that the high prevalence in Egypt was linked to a discontinued mass-treatment campaign for schistosomiasis, using improperly sterilized glass syringes.

In the United States, about 2% of people have chronic hepatitis C. In 2014, an estimated 30,500 new acute hepatitis C cases occurred (0.7 per 100,000 population), an increase from 2010 to 2012. The number of deaths from hepatitis C rose to 15,800 in 2008 having overtaken HIV/AIDS as a cause of death in the US in 2007. In 2014, it was the single greatest cause of infectious death in the United States. This mortality rate is expected to increase, as those infected by transfusion before HCV testing become apparent. In Europe, the percentage of people with chronic infections has been estimated to be between 0.13 and 3.26%.

In the United Kingdom, about 118,000 people were chronically infected in 2019. About half of the people using a needle exchange in London in 2017–18 tested positive for hepatitis C of which half were unaware that they had it. As part of a bid to eradicate hepatitis C by 2025, NHS England conducted a large procurement exercise in 2019. Merck Sharp & Dohme, Gilead Sciences, and Abbvie were awarded contracts, which, together, are worth up to £1 billion over five years. NHS England claimed to be leading the world in efforts to eliminate the disease in 2026 having reduced deaths by 36% since 2016.

The total number of people with this infection is higher in some countries in Africa and Asia. Countries with particularly high rates of infection include Pakistan (4.8%) and China (3.2%).

Since 2014, extremely effective treatments have been available to eradicate the disease within 8–12 weeks in most people. In 2015, about 950,000 people were treated while 1.7 million new infections occurred, meaning that overall the number of people with HCV increased. These numbers differ by country and improved in 2016, with some countries achieving higher cure rates than new infection rates (mostly high-income countries). By 2018, twelve countries are on track to achieve HCV elimination. While antiviral agents will curb new infections, it is less clear whether they impact overall deaths and morbidity. Furthermore, for them to be effective, people need to be aware of their infection – it is estimated that worldwide only 20% of infected people are aware of their infection (in the US, fewer than half were aware).

== History ==
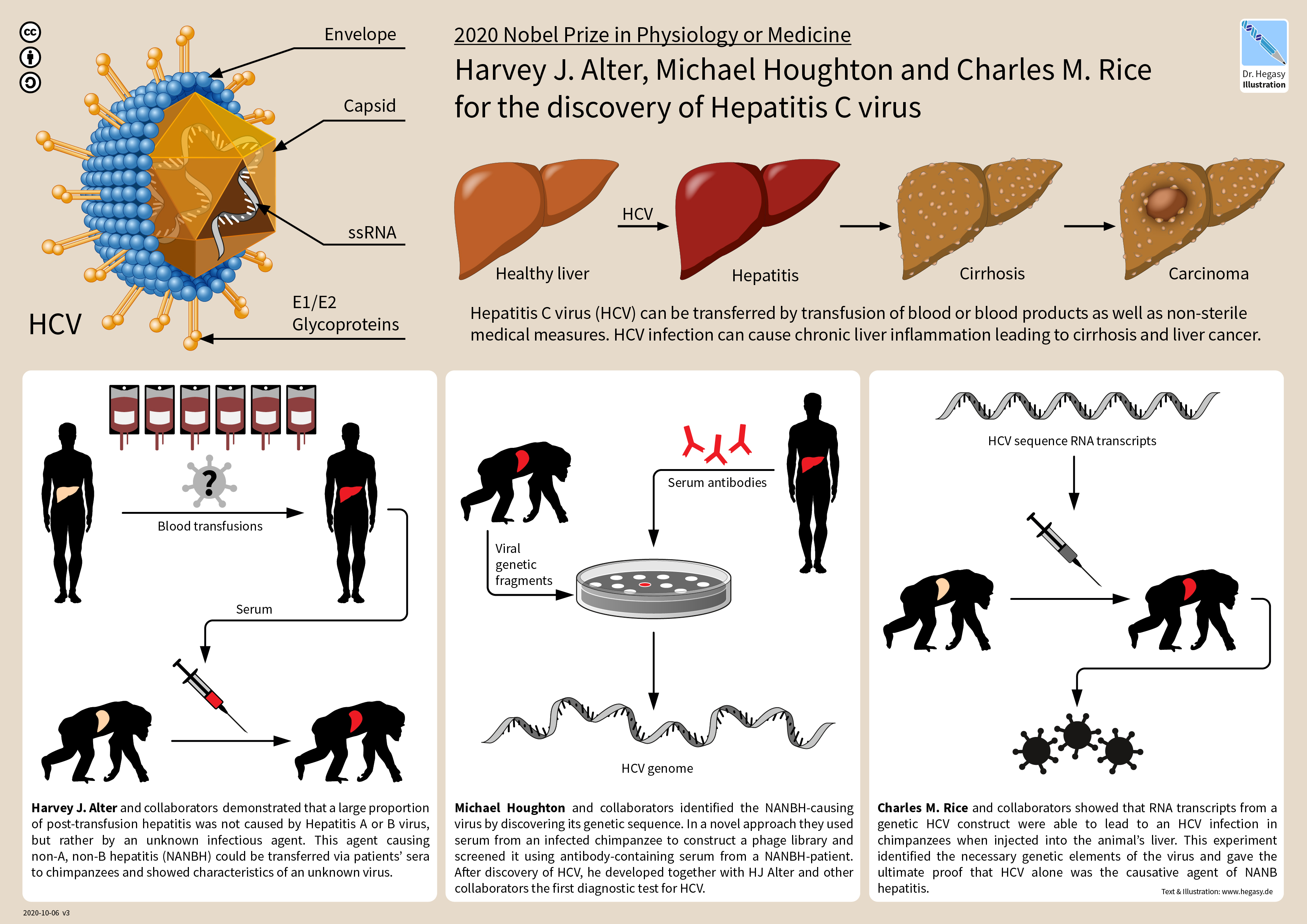
Nobel Prize in Physiology or Medicine 2020: Seminal experiments by HJ Alter, M Houghton and CM Rice leading to the discovery of HCV as the causative agent of non-A, non-B hepatitis

In the mid-1970s, Harvey J. Alter, Chief of the Infectious Disease Section in the Department of Transfusion Medicine at the National Institutes of Health, and his research team demonstrated how most post-transfusion hepatitis cases were not due to hepatitis A or B viruses. Despite this discovery, international research efforts to identify the virus, initially called non-A, non-B hepatitis (NANBH), failed for the next decade. In 1987, Michael Houghton, Qui-Lim Choo, and George Kuo at Chiron Corporation, collaborating with Daniel W. Bradley at the Centers for Disease Control and Prevention, used a novel molecular cloning approach to identify the unknown organism and develop a diagnostic test. In 1988, Alter confirmed the virus by verifying its presence in a panel of NANBH specimens, and Chiron announced its discovery at a Washington, D.C. press conference in May 1988.

At the time, Chiron was in talks with the Japanese health ministry to sell a biotech version of the hepatitis B vaccine. Simultaneously, Emperor Hirohito had developed cancer and required numerous blood transfusions. The Japanese health ministry placed a screening order for Chiron's experimental NANBH test. Chiron's Japanese marketing subsidiary, Diagnostic Systems KK, introduced the term "Hepatitis C" in November 1988 in Tokyo news reports publicizing the testing of the emperor's blood. Chiron sold a screening order to the Japanese health ministry in November 1988, earning the company US$60 million a year. However, because Chiron had not published any of its research and did not make a culture model available to other researchers to verify Chiron's discovery, hepatitis C earned the nickname "The Emperor's New Virus."

In April 1989, the "discovery" of HCV was published in two articles in the journal Science. Chiron filed for several patents on the virus and its diagnosis. A competing patent application by the CDC was dropped in 1990 after Chiron paid $1.9 million to the CDC and $337,500 to Bradley. In 1994, Bradley sued Chiron, seeking to invalidate the patent, have himself included as a co-inventor, and receive damages and royalty income. The court ruled against him, which was sustained on appeal in 1998. Because of the unique molecular "isolation" of the hepatitis C virus, although Houghton and Kuo's team at Chiron had discovered strong biochemical markers for the virus and the test proved effective at reducing cases of post-transfusion hepatitis, the existence of a hepatitis C virus was essentially inferred. In 1992, the San Francisco Chronicle reported that the virus had never been observed under an electron microscope. In 1997, the American FDA approved the first hepatitis C drug based on a surrogate marker called "Sustained Virological Response." In response, the pharmaceutical industry established a nationwide network of "Astro-Turf" patient advocacy groups to raise awareness (and fear) of the disease.

In 2001 Muhamad Aly Rifai demonstrated the first evidence indicating a significant association between hepatitis C and psychiatric disorders (psychotic, affective, anxiety and substance use disorders) In 2002, the United States Department of Veterans Affairs commissioned a larger study to replicate these findings and confirmed the significant association between hepatitis C and psychiatric disorders. Muhamad Aly Rifai advocates for screening patients with psychiatric disorders for hepatitis C.

Hepatitis C was finally "discovered" in 2005 when a Japanese team was able to propagate a molecular clone in a cell culture called Huh7. This discovery enabled proper characterization of the viral particle and rapid research into the development of protease inhibitors replacing early interferon treatments. The first of these, sofosbuvir, was approved on December 6, 2013. These drugs are marketed as "cures;" however, because they were approved on the basis of surrogate markers and not clinical endpoints such as prolonging life or improving liver health, many experts question their value.

After blood screening began, a notable hepatitis C prevalence was discovered in Egypt, which claimed six million individuals were infected by unsterile needles in a late 1970s mass chemotherapy campaign to eliminate schistosomiasis (snail fever).

On October 5, 2020, Houghton and Alter, together with Charles M. Rice, were awarded the Nobel Prize in Physiology or Medicine for their work.

== Society and culture ==
World Hepatitis Day, held on July 28, is coordinated by the World Hepatitis Alliance. The economic costs of hepatitis C are significant both to the individual and to society. In the United States, the average lifetime cost of the disease was estimated at US$33,407 in 2003 with the cost of a liver transplant as of 2011 costing approximately US$200,000. In Canada, the cost of a course of antiviral treatment is as high as 30,000 CAD in 2003, while the United States costs are between 9,200 and US$17,600 in 1998. In many areas of the world, people cannot afford treatment with antivirals as they either lack insurance coverage or their insurance will not pay for antivirals. In the English National Health Service treatment rates for hepatitis C were higher among less deprived groups in 2010–2012.

Hepatitis C–infected Spanish anaesthetist Juan Maeso was jailed for the maximum possible period of 20 years for infecting 275 patients between 1988 and 1997, as he used the same needles to give both himself and the patients opioids.

== Special populations ==
=== Children and pregnancy ===
Compared with adults, infection in children is much less understood. Worldwide, the prevalence of hepatitis C virus infection in pregnant women and children has been estimated to be 1–8% and 0.05–5%, respectively. The vertical transmission rate has been estimated to be 3–5% and there is a high rate of spontaneous clearance (25–50%) in the children. Higher rates have been reported for both vertical transmission (18%, 6–36%, and 41%) and prevalence in children (15%).

In developed countries, transmission around the time of birth is now the leading cause of HCV infection. In the absence of the Hepatitis C virus in the mother's blood, transmission is rare. Factors associated with an increased rate of infection include membrane rupture of longer than 6 hours before delivery and procedures exposing the infant to maternal blood. Cesarean sections are not recommended. Breastfeeding is considered safe if the nipples are not damaged. Infection around the time of birth in one child does not increase the risk in a subsequent pregnancy. All genotypes appear to have the same risk of transmission.

HCV infection is frequently found in children who have previously been presumed to have non-A, non-B hepatitis and cryptogenic liver disease. The presentation in childhood may be asymptomatic or with elevated liver function tests. While the infection is commonly asymptomatic, both cirrhosis with liver failure and hepatocellular carcinoma may occur in childhood.

=== Immunosuppressed ===
The rate of hepatitis C in immunosuppressed people is higher. This is particularly true in those with human immunodeficiency virus infection, recipients of organ transplants, and those with hypogammaglobulinemia. Infection in these people is associated with an unusually rapid progression to cirrhosis. People with stable HIV who never received medication for HCV may be treated with a combination of peginterferon plus ribavirin with caution due to the possible side effects.

== Research ==
As of 2011, there are about one hundred medications in development for hepatitis C. These include vaccines to treat hepatitis, immunomodulators, and cyclophilin inhibitors, among others. These potential new treatments have come about due to a better understanding of the hepatitis C virus. There are several vaccines under development and some have shown encouraging results.

The combination of sofosbuvir and velpatasvir in one trial (reported in 2015) resulted in cure rates of 99%. More studies are needed to investigate the role of the preventive antiviral medication against HCV recurrence after transplantation.

=== Animal models ===
One barrier to finding treatments for hepatitis C is the lack of a suitable animal model. Despite moderate success, research highlights the need for pre-clinical testing in mammalian systems such as mouse, particularly to develop vaccines in poorer communities. Chimpanzees remain the only living system to study, yet their use has ethical concerns and regulatory restrictions. While scientists have used human cell culture systems such as hepatocytes, questions have been raised about their accuracy in reflecting the body's response to infection.

One aspect of hepatitis research is to reproduce infections in mammalian models. A strategy is to introduce liver tissues from humans into mice, a technique known as xenotransplantation. This is done by generating chimeric mice and exposing the mice to HCV infection. This engineering process is known to create humanized mice and provide opportunities to study hepatitis C within the 3D architectural design of the liver and evaluate antiviral compounds. Alternatively, generating inbred mice with susceptibility to HCV would simplify the process of studying mouse models.

== See also ==
- PSI-6130, an experimental drug treatment
- HONOReform (Hepatitis Outbreaks National Organization for Reform)
