= Md. Abdul Mannan (politician) =

Bangladeshi politician (born 1959)

- মোঃ আব্দুল মান্নান

Member of the Bangladesh Parliament for Brahmanbaria-5
- Incumbent
- Assumed office 17 February 2026
- Preceded by: Fayzur Rahman

Personal details
- Born: 1 July 1959 (age 67) Nabinagar Upazila, Brahmanbaria District
- Party: Bangladesh Nationalist Party

Md. Abdul Mannan is a Bangladeshi politician. He is currently serving as a member of parliament from Brahmanbaria-5.

== Early life ==
Mannan was born on 1 July 1959 at Nabinagar Upazila under Brahmanbaria District.
