= Voxilaprevir =

Protease inhibitor

Clinical data
- Trade names: Vosevi (combination with sofosbuvir and velpatasvir)

Identifiers
- IUPAC name: (1R,18R,20R,24S,27S,28S)-N-[(1R,2R)-2-(Difluoromethyl)-1-{[(1-methylcyclopropyl)sulfonyl]carbamoyl}cyclopropyl]-28-ethyl-13,13-difluoro-7-methoxy-24-(2-methyl-2-propanyl)-22,25-dioxo-2,21-dioxa-4,11,23,26-tetraazapentacyclo[24.2.1.0^{3,12}.0^{5,10}.0^{18,20}]nonacosa-3(12),4,6,8,10-pentaene-27-carboxamide
- CAS Number: 1535212-07-7
- PubChem CID: 89921642
- ChemSpider: 44209500
- UNII: 0570F37359
- KEGG: D10899
- PDB ligand: L9P (PDBe, RCSB PDB)
- CompTox Dashboard (EPA): DTXSID301027947

Chemical and physical data
- Formula: C_{40}H_{52}F_{4}N_{6}O_{9}S
- Molar mass: 868.94 g·mol^{−1}
- 3D model (JSmol)
- Density: 1.4±0.1 g/cm^{3}
- SMILES: CC[C@@H]1[C@@H]2CN([C@@H]1C(=O)N[C@@]3(C[C@H]3C(F)F)C(=O)NS(=O)(=O)C4(CC4)C)C(=O)[C@@H](NC(=O)O[C@@H]5C[C@H]5CCCCC(c6c(nc7cc(ccc7n6)OC)O2)(F)F)C(C)(C)C
- InChI: InChI=1S/C40H52F4N6O9S/c1-7-22-27-19-50(28(22)32(51)48-39(18-23(39)31(41)42)35(53)49-60(55,56)38(5)14-15-38)34(52)30(37(2,3)4)47-36(54)59-26-16-20(26)10-8-9-13-40(43,44)29-33(58-27)46-25-17-21(57-6)11-12-24(25)45-29/h11-12,17,20,22-23,26-28,30-31H,7-10,13-16,18-19H2,1-6H3,(H,47,54)(H,48,51)(H,49,53)/t20-,22-,23+,26-,27+,28+,30-,39-/m1/s1; Key:MZBLZLWXUBZHSL-FZNJKFJKSA-N

Voxilaprevir is a hepatitis C virus (HCV) nonstructural (NS) protein 3/4A protease inhibitor (by Gilead) that is used in combination with sofosbuvir and velpatasvir. The combination has the trade name Vosevi and received a positive opinion from the European Committee for Medicinal Products for Human Use in June 2017.

On 18 July 2017, Vosevi was approved by the US Food and Drug Administration.
