= Shah Jikrul Ahmad =

Bangladeshi politician (1951–2022)

- শাহ জিকরুল আহমাদ

Member of Parliament for Brahmanbaria-5
- In office 25 January 2009 – 24 January 2014
- Preceded by: Kazi Md. Anowar Hossain
- Succeeded by: Fayzur Rahman

Personal details
- Born: 16 November 1951
- Died: 7 May 2022 (aged 70) Gopalganj, Bangladesh
- Party: Jatiyo Samajtantrik Dal

Shah Jikrul Ahmad (16 November 1951 – 7 May 2022) was a Jatiyo Samajtantrik Dal politician and served as a Jatiya Sangsad member representing the Brahmanbaria-5 constituency.

== Career ==
Ahmad was elected to parliament from Brahmanbaria-5 as a JSD (Inu) candidate in 2008.
