= Beacon Pharmaceuticals =

Pharmaceutical company of Bangladesh

Beacon Pharmaceuticals PLC
- Company type: Public
- Traded as: DSE: BEACONPHAR, CSE: BEACONPHAR
- Industry: Pharmaceutics; Biotechnology
- Founded: 2006; 20 years ago
- Headquarters: Motijheel, Dhaka, Bangladesh
- Key people: Mohammad Ebadul Karim Bulbul, (MD)
- Products: Sofosvel, Darvoni, Tagrix, Crizonix, Daclavir, Soforal, Afanix, Axinix, Brigaix, Baricinix, Cabozanix, Dasanix, Hernix, Elbonix, Ibrutix, Lenvanix, Palbonix, Regonix, Tofacinix, and Wedica
- Website: beaconpharma.com.bd

Beacon Pharmaceuticals PLC is a Bangladeshi pharmaceutical company that develops generic version of medications.

Beacon manufactures more than 200 generic drugs and 65 oncology products. Beacon is the first company in Bangladesh to start export of cancer drugs. The company is exporting its products to Asia, Africa, Europe and Latin America. Beacon is public limited company listed in Dhaka & Chittagong stock exchange. About 2000 people are working in this company.

Beacon has introduced a number of global first generics.

The company's commercially available products include velpatasvir/sofosbuvir, sofosbuvir/daclatasvir, osimertinib, crizotinib, daclatasvir, sofosbuvir, afatinib, axitinib, brigatinib, baricitinib, cabozantinib, dasatinib, neratinib, eltrombopag, ibrutinib, lenvatinib, palbociclib, regorafenib, tofacitinib, and trelagliptin.

BEACON Medicare Limited (BML) is the exclusive global marketing & distribution partner of Beacon Pharmaceuticals Limited.
