= Generalized erythema =

- Specialty: Dermatology

Generalized erythema is a skin condition that may be caused by medications, bacterial toxins, or viral infections.

== See also ==
- Necrolytic acral erythema
- List of cutaneous conditions
