= Abdul Latif (Bangladeshi politician) =

Bangladeshi politician

Member of Bangladesh Parliament
- In office 1996–2001
- Preceded by: Kazi Md. Anwar Hossain
- Succeeded by: Kazi Md. Anwar Hossain

Personal details
- Died: 17 November 2001
- Political party: Bangladesh Awami League

Abdul Latif was a Bangladesh Awami League politician and member of parliament for Brahmanbaria-5.

== Career ==
Latif was a freedom fighter during the Bangladesh Liberation War. He was elected to parliament for Brahmanbaria-5 as a Bangladesh Awami League candidate in 1996. He made Nabinagar a municipality and founded Nabinagar Mohila Degree College.

== Death ==
Latif died on 17 November 2001.
