= HONOReform =

HONOReform (Hepatitis Outbreaks National Organization for Reform) – is a patient advocacy organization that seeks to promote adherence to injection safety guidelines and increase governmental oversight of outpatient medical facilities. In addition to promoting lessons learned from outbreaks of hepatitis C, the organization advocates for a more compassionate response to large scale medical disasters.

HONOReform was founded by patients and families impacted by a Nebraska outbreak of hepatitis C in which 99 cancer patients were infected when doctors and nurses at their oncology clinic were found to have reused syringes. For years it remained the largest outbreak of hepatitis C in American healthcare history, though similar tragedies continue to occur.

Since 1998, the Centers for Disease Control and Prevention (CDC) has documented 33 outbreaks of hepatitis B and C as a result of negligent injection safety practices in nonhospital healthcare settings. In January 2009, the Annals of Internal Medicine noted over 60,000 patients have been verified by the CDC to be potentially exposed to hepatitis in the outbreaks and that the outbreaks are likely much higher than reported.

== History ==
HONOReform was founded by Evelyn McKnight, Dr. Tom McKnight, and Travis Bennington, all of Fremont, Nebraska. Evelyn McKnight is an audiologist who was battling a recurrence of breast cancer when she learned she had been infected with hepatitis C because improper injection safety protocols at the Fremont Cancer Center.

During chemotherapy treatments, medical professionals access multi-dose bags of saline to flush patient ports. Outbreaks occur as a result of doctors and nurses reusing syringes, contaminating the saline bag with the blood of multiple patients.

Tom McKnight – Evelyn’s husband – is a local family practice physician who helped uncover the outbreak when some of his patients were found to have hepatitis C. Travis Bennington is a local attorney who represented 19 of the 99 Nebraska patients in their malpractice claims.

HONOReform was founded in 2007 using settlement funds Evelyn McKnight secured in her malpractice trial. HONOReform was established to advocate patient justice, safety, and compassion by promoting the lessons learned from hepatitis outbreaks.

== Mission and activities ==
Since its formation, HONOReform advocates have lobbied the U.S. Congress and federal health agencies for greater oversight of private physician offices and other stand-alone healthcare facilities. HONOReform has fought to raise awareness to widely accepted healthcare standards that call for using syringes and similar products once.

In addition to its federal advocacy efforts, HONOReform leaders have helped other communities recover from similar outbreaks. Following the Las Vegas, Nevada tragedy, Evelyn McKnight testified before the Nevada Legislature’s Legislative Committee on Health Care and also took part in numerous community healing and education events.

=== The One and Only Campaign ===
The Safe Injection Practices Coalition (SIPC) is a partnership of healthcare-related organizations, patient advocacy organizations, industry partners, and other public health partners, led by the Centers for Disease Control and Prevention (CDC). The CDC Foundation is the convening partner of the Coalition, formed to promote safe injection practices in all U.S. healthcare settings. In 2009, SIPC Founding Partners developed the One & Only Campaign—a public health education and awareness campaign—aimed at both healthcare providers and patients to advance and promote safe injection practices. Although safe injection practices represent very basic infection control measures, CDC continues to identify and investigate outbreaks associated with poor practices. Breakdowns in proper infection control have involved providers reusing needles, syringes or single-dose medication vials, all of which are meant for one patient and one procedure. These breaches can cause irreparable damage, exposing patients to bloodborne illnesses such as hepatitis and HIV, and to life-threatening bacterial infections. Through targeted education and awareness efforts, the One & Only Campaign empowers patients and healthcare providers to insist on nothing less than safe injections – every time, for every patient.

== Other notable outbreaks ==
=== Las Vegas, Nevada ===
In February 2008, the largest patient notification of its kind occurred when 40,000 patients of the Endoscopy Center of Southern Nevada in Las Vegas were urged to be tested for hepatitis and HIV. Subsequently, an additional 10,000 patients of the center along with 13,000 patients at the Desert Shadow Endoscopy Center were advised to be tested. To date, a total of 114 confirmed cases of hepatitis C have been linked to the outbreaks.

=== Grand Rapids, Michigan ===
More than 16,000 patients of Grand Rapids, Michigan dermatologist Dr. Robert W. Stokes were issued letters urging them to be tested for hepatitis, HIV and other diseases. Dr. Stokes was accused of reusing on patients syringes and sutures intended for one-time use in one patient. Stokes is currently in federal prison, serving a 10 1/2-year sentence for insurance fraud, and has had his medical license revoked. Patients impacted by the outbreak pushed for a number of reforms including greater penalties for such actions and a measure that would prohibit or severely limit the reuse of medical devices.

=== Laurinburg, North Carolina ===
In September 2008, 1,200 patients at a cardiology practice in Laurinburg, North Carolina were warned of exposure to hepatitis, HIV and other diseases because of unsafe medical practices at the office of Dr. Matthew Block. To date, eight patients have been tested positive for hepatitis in relation to procedures at the clinic.

== Book exposing the Nebraska Outbreak ==
In September 2008, Evelyn McKnight and Travis Bennington published a book focused on the Nebraska outbreak entitled A Never Event: Exposing the Largest Outbreak of Hepatitis C in American Healthcare History. The book was originally produced, designed and published by Arbor Books and is now published by History Examined, LLC.
