= Brahmanbaria-5 =

Constituency of Bangladesh's Jatiya Sangsad

Coordinates: 23.89°N 90.97°E

- Constituency for the Jatiya Sangsad
- District: Brahmanbaria District
- Division: Chittagong Division
- Electorate: 343,892 (2018)

Current constituency
- Created: 1984
- Party: Bangladesh Nationalist Party
- Member: Md. Abdul Mannan
- ← 246 Brahmanbaria-4 248 Brahmanbaria-6 →

Brahmanbaria-5 is a constituency represented in the Jatiya Sangsad (National Parliament) of Bangladesh since 2026 by Md. Abdul Mannan of the Bangladesh Nationalist Party.

== Boundaries ==
The constituency encompasses Nabinagar Upazila.

== History ==
The constituency was created in 1984 from a Comilla constituency when the former Comilla District was split into three districts: Brahmanbaria, Comilla, and Chandpur.

Ahead of the 2008 general election, the Election Commission redrew constituency boundaries to reflect population changes revealed by the 2001 Bangladesh census. The 2008 redistricting altered the boundaries of the constituency.

Ahead of the 2018 general election, the Election Commission expanded the boundaries of the constituency by adding two union parishads of Nabinagar Upazila: Barikandi and Salimganj.

== Members of Parliament ==
Election	Member	Party
1986	Kazi Md. Anwar Hossain	Jatiya Party
Feb 1996	Siddiqur Rahman	Bangladesh Nationalist Party
Jun 1996	Abdul Latif	Awami League
2001	Kazi Md. Anowar Hossain	Bangladesh Jatiya Party
2008	Shah Jikrul Ahmad	Jatiyo Samajtantrik Dal
2014	Fayzur Rahman	Awami League
2018	Mohammad Ebadul Karim Bulbul	Awami League
2024	Fayzur Rahman	Awami League
2026	Md. Abdul Mannan	Bangladesh Nationalist Party

== Elections ==
=== Elections in the 2020s ===
General Election 2026: Brahmanbaria-5
Party	Candidate	Votes	%	±%
BNP	Md. Abdul Mannan	85,769	50.31	+12.41
Independent	Kazi Nazmul Hossain	84,708	49.69	N/A
Majority		1,061	0.62	−84.88
Turnout		260,090	54.78	−0.22
Registered electors		474,826		
BNP gain from AL				

=== Elections in the 2010s ===
General Election 2014: Brahmanbaria-5
Party	Candidate	Votes	%	±%
AL	Fayzur Rahman	140,057	92.8	+34.8
JP(E)	Md. Mamunur Rashid	10,935	7.2	N/A
Majority		129,122	85.5	+65.4
Turnout		150,992	55.0	−28.4
AL hold				

=== Elections in the 2000s ===
General Election 2008: Brahmanbaria-5
Party	Candidate	Votes	%	±%
AL	Shah Jikrul Ahmad	113,173	58.0	+23.2
BNP	Kazi Md. Anawar Hossain	73,922	37.9	−21.5
IAB	Md. Sorif Uddin	3,549	1.8	N/A
Independent	A. K. Delwar Hussain	3,095	1.6	N/A
BDB	Sabara Begum	869	0.4	N/A
Independent	Md. Musfiqur Rahman	470	0.2	N/A
Majority		39,251	20.1	−4.4
Turnout		195,078	83.4	+18.1
AL gain from BJP				

General Election 2001: Brahmanbaria-5
Party	Candidate	Votes	%	±%
BJP	Kazi Md. Anowar Hossain	102,890	59.4	+29.6
AL	Abdul Latif	60,368	34.8	−11.0
IJOF	Md. Zeaul Haq Sarkar	8,847	5.1	N/A
BKA	Mujibur Rahman Hamidi	566	0.3	N/A
Independent	Mohammad Raju	293	0.2	N/A
JSD	Md. Golam Kibria	206	0.1	N/A
Independent	Md. Mizanur Rahman Khan	110	0.1	N/A
Jatiya Party (M)	Md. Jakir Hossain	52	0.0	N/A
Majority		42,522	24.5	+8.5
Turnout		173,332	65.3	−3.4
BJP gain from AL				

=== Elections in the 1990s ===
General Election June 1996: Brahmanbaria-5
Party	Candidate	Votes	%	±%
AL	Abdul Latif	60,474	45.8	+8.9
BNP	Takdir Hossain Md. Jasim	39,371	29.8	+23.1
JP(E)	Ziaul Haque Sarkar	25,071	19.0	−23.0
Jamaat	Mohammad Idris	4,536	3.4	N/A
Zaker Party	Md. Saheb Ali	1,196	0.9	+0.2
IOJ	Mahabubur Rahman	760	0.6	N/A
FP	Nurul Ain	249	0.2	N/A
Bangladesh Samajtantrik Dal (Khalekuzzaman)	Md. Jakirul Haque Bahar	221	0.2	N/A
Sammilita Sangram Parishad	Fazlul Haque Amini	114	0.1	N/A
Majority		21,103	16.0	+11.0
Turnout		131,992	68.7	+18.7
AL gain from JP(E)				

General Election 1991: Brahmanbaria-5
Party	Candidate	Votes	%	±%
JP(E)	Kazi Md. Anwar Hossain	60,830	42.0	
AL	A. Kuddus	53,522	36.9	
Independent	Golam Morshed	18,844	13.0	
BNP	Hamidul Haq	9,749	6.7	
Zaker Party	Md. Shaheb Ali	1,011	0.7	
Jatiya Samajtantrik Dal-JSD	Sharif Mohammad Khan	423	0.3	
Bangladesh Muslim League (Kader)	Atiqul Islam	308	0.2	
Jatiya Janata Party (Sheikh Asad)	Aamir Hossain	249	0.2	
Majority		7,308	5.0	
Turnout		144,936	50.0	
JP(E) hold				
