= Sofosbuvir/velpatasvir/voxilaprevir =

Combination drug

Combination of
- Sofosbuvir: NS5B RNA polymerase inhibitor
- Velpatasvir: NS5A inhibitor
- Voxilaprevir: NS3/4A protease inhibitor

Clinical data
- Trade names: Vosevi
- AHFS/Drugs.com: Monograph
- MedlinePlus: a617037
- License data: US DailyMed: Vosevi
- Pregnancy category: AU: B1
- Routes of administration: By mouth (tablets)
- ATC code: J05AP56 (WHO)

Legal status
- Legal status: AU: S4 (Prescription only); CA: ℞-only; US: ℞-only; EU: Rx-only

Identifiers
- PubChem CID: 129011857
- KEGG: D10900

Chemical and physical data
- Formula: C_{111}H_{135}F_{5}N_{17}O_{26}PS
- Molar mass: 2281.42 g·mol^{−1}
- 3D model (JSmol): Interactive image
- SMILES: CCC1C2CN(C1C(=O)NC3(CC3C(F)F)C(=O)NS(=O)(=O)C4(CC4)C)C(=O)C(NC(=O)OC5CC5CCCCC(C6=NC7=C(C=C(C=C7)OC)N=C6O2)(F)F)C(C)(C)C.CC1CCC(N1C(=O)C(C(C)C)NC(=O)OC)C2=NC3=C(N2)C=CC4=CC5=C(C=C43)OCC6=C5C=CC(=C6)C7=CN=C(N7)C8CC(CN8C(=O)C(C9=CC=CC=C9)NC(=O)OC)COC.CC(C)OC(=O)C(C)NP(=O)(OCC1C(C(C(O1)N2C=CC(=O)NC2=O)(C)F)O)OC3=CC=CC=C3
- InChI: InChI=1S/C49H54N8O8.C40H52F4N6O9S.C22H29FN3O9P/c1-26(2)41(54-48(60)63-5)47(59)57-27(3)12-17-38(57)45-51-36-16-14-30-20-35-33-15-13-31(19-32(33)25-65-40(35)21-34(30)43(36)53-45)37-22-50-44(52-37)39-18-28(24-62-4)23-56(39)46(58)42(55-49(61)64-6)29-10-8-7-9-11-29;1-7-22-27-19-50(28(22)32(51)48-39(18-23(39)31(41)42)35(53)49-60(55,56)38(5)14-15-38)34(52)30(37(2,3)4)47-36(54)59-26-16-20(26)10-8-9-13-40(43,44)29-33(58-27)46-25-17-21(57-6)11-12-24(25)45-29;1-13(2)33-19(29)14(3)25-36(31,35-15-8-6-5-7-9-15)32-12-16-18(28)22(4,23)20(34-16)26-11-10-17(27)24-21(26)30/h7-11,13-16,19-22,26-28,38-39,41-42H,12,17-18,23-25H2,1-6H3,(H,50,52)(H,51,53)(H,54,60)(H,55,61);11-12,17,20,22-23,26-28,30-31H,7-10,13-16,18-19H2,1-6H3,(H,47,54)(H,48,51)(H,49,53);5-11,13-14,16,18,20,28H,12H2,1-4H3,(H,25,31)(H,24,27,30)/t27-,28-,38-,39-,41-,42+;20-,22-,23+,26-,27+,28+,30-,39-;14-,16+,18+,20+,22+,36-/m010/s1; Key:FMWRYUBVSONSCK-ZYTFCPLVSA-N

Sofosbuvir/velpatasvir/voxilaprevir, sold under the brand name Vosevi, is a fixed-dose combination medication for the treatment of hepatitis C. It contains sofosbuvir, a hepatitis C virus (HCV) nucleotide analog NS5B polymerase inhibitor; velpatasvir, an HCV NS5A inhibitor; and voxilaprevir an HCV NS3/4A protease inhibitor.

The most common adverse reactions include headache, fatigue, diarrhea, and nausea.

The combination was approved for medical use in the United States and in the European Union in July 2017. Vosevi is sold by Gilead Sciences.

== Medical uses ==
In the US, sofosbuvir/velpatasvir/voxilaprevir is indicated for the treatment of adults with chronic hepatitis C virus infection without cirrhosis (liver disease) or with compensated cirrhosis (Child-Pugh A).

In the EU, it is indicated for the treatment of chronic hepatitis C virus infection in people aged twelve years of aged and older and weighing at least 30 kilograms (66 lb).

== Adverse effects ==
The FDA label for sofosbuvir/velpatasvir/voxilaprevir contains a boxed warning about the risk of Hepatitis B virus reactivation.

== History ==
The safety and efficacy of sofosbuvir/velpatasvir/voxilaprevir was evaluated in two phase III clinical trials that enrolled approximately 750 adults without cirrhosis or with mild cirrhosis. The first trial compared twelve weeks of treatment with the combination versus treatment with placebo in adults with genotype 1 who had previously failed treatment with an NS5A inhibitor drug. Participants with genotypes 2, 3, 4, 5, or 6 all received the combination. The second trial compared twelve weeks of treatment with the combination versus treatment with the previously approved drugs sofosbuvir and velpatasvir in adults with genotypes 1, 2, or 3 who had previously failed treatment with sofosbuvir but not an NS5A inhibitor drug. Results of both trials demonstrated that 96-97 percent of participants who received the combination had no virus detected in the blood 12 weeks after finishing treatment, suggesting that participants’ infection had been cured.

The US Food and Drug Administration (FDA) granted the application for sofosbuvir/velpatasvir/voxilaprevir priority review and breakthrough therapy designations. The FDA granted approval of Vosevi to Gilead Sciences Inc.
