= Mohammad Ebadul Karim Bulbul =

Bangladeshi politician

- মোহাম্মদ এবাদুল করিম বুলবুল

Jatiya Sangsad member from Brahmanbaria-5
- In office 2019–2024
- Preceded by: Fayzur Rahman

Personal details
- Born: 27 December 1955 (age 69) Nabinagar, Brahmanbaria
- Political party: Bangladesh Awami League

Mohammad Ebadul Karim Bulbul (Bengali: মোহাম্মদ এবাদুল করিম বুলবুল; born 27 December 1956) is a Bangladesh Awami League politician and former member of parliament from Brahmanbaria-5. He is a managing director of Beacon Pharmaceuticals.

== Early life ==
Bulbul was born on 27 December 1956. He was born in Barail, Nabinagar Upazila, Brahmanbaria District. He studied up to a H.S.C degree.

== Career ==
Bulbul was elected to parliament from Brahmanbaria-5 as a candidate of the Awami League on 30 December 2018. He served as an advisor to Bangladesh Krishak League.

Bulbul is the managing director of Beacon Pharmaceuticals. He contracted COVID-19 in May 2020 during the COVID-19 pandemic in Bangladesh.

On 26 April 2021, journalist Gauranga Debnath Apu was threatened by a mob outside his home who threatened to cut off his limbs. They said that no one would be allowed to reside in Brahmanbaria if they wrote against Bulbul.
