= PSI-6130 =

Chemical compound

Clinical data
- ATC code: none

Identifiers
- IUPAC name: 4-Amino-1-((2R,3R,4R,5R)-3-fluoro-4-hydroxy-5-(hydroxymethyl)-3-methyltetrahydrofuran-2-yl)pyrimidin-2(1H)-one
- CAS Number: 817204-33-4
- PubChem CID: 6481236
- ChemSpider: 4981776
- UNII: 05J68784G1
- ChEMBL: ChEMBL223482
- CompTox Dashboard (EPA): DTXSID10231287

Chemical and physical data
- Formula: C_{10}H_{14}FN_{3}O_{4}
- Molar mass: 259.237 g·mol^{−1}
- 3D model (JSmol): Interactive image
- SMILES: C[C@]1([C@@H]([C@H](O[C@H]1n2ccc(nc2=O)N)CO)O)F
- InChI: InChI=1S/C10H14FN3O4/c1-10(11)7(16)5(4-15)18-8(10)14-3-2-6(12)13-9(14)17/h2-3,5,7-8,15-16H,4H2,1H3,(H2,12,13,17)/t5-,7-,8-,10-/m1/s1; Key:NYPIRLYMDJMKGW-VPCXQMTMSA-N

PSI-6130 is an experimental treatment for hepatitis C. PSI-6130 is a member of a class of antiviral drugs known as nucleoside polymerase inhibitors that was created by chemist Jeremy L. Clark. Specifically, PSI-6130 inhibits the hepatitis C virus RNA dependent RNA polymerase called NS5B.

PSI-6130 is currently being developed by Hoffmann–La Roche as a 3',5'-diisobutyrl ester prodrug, R7128. R7128 is part of the combination of all-oral agents clinical trial known as INFORM-1.
