= Fayzur Rahman =

Bangladeshi politician

- ফয়জুর রহমান

Member of the Bangladesh Parliament for Brahmanbaria-5
- In office 30 January 2024 – 6 August 2024
- Preceded by: Mohammad Ebadul Karim Bulbul
- In office 29 January 2014 – 28 December 2019
- Preceded by: Shah Jikrul Ahmad

Personal details
- Born: 5 November 1966 (age 60)
- Party: Bangladesh Awami League

Fayzur Rahman (born 5 November 1966) is a Bangladesh Awami League politician and a former Jatiya Sangsad member representing the Brahmanbaria-5 constituency.

== Early life ==
Fayz was born on 5 November 1966. He has studied up to SSC or grade ten.

== Career ==
In 1992, Fayz joined Epic Design, a buying house, as an assistant merchandiser. In 1995 he joined the merchandising department of the Winners Limited, a buying house, as a manager. He was appointed the managing director of Tusuka garments. He was elected to parliament from Brahmanbaria-5 in 2014 as a candidate of Awami League. He is the Chairman of Novoair.

Fayz term as member of Parliament ended on 30 December 2018.

Fayz was detained by Detective Branch in September 2025.
