= Velpatasvir =

Chemical compound

Clinical data
- Trade names: Epclusa, Sofosvel, Velpanat (all in combination with sofosbuvir)
- Routes of administration: Oral (tablets)
- ATC code: J05AP55 (WHO) (combination with sofosbuvir) J05AP56 (WHO) (combination with sofosbuvir and voxilaprevir)

Legal status
- Legal status: US: ℞-only

Pharmacokinetic data
- Protein binding: >99.5%
- Metabolism: Liver (CYP2B6, 2C8, 3A4)
- Elimination half-life: 15 hours
- Excretion: Feces (94%), urine (0.4%)

Identifiers
- IUPAC name: Methyl {(2S)-1-[(2S,5S)-2-(9-{2-[(2S,4S)-1-{(2R)-2-[(methoxycarbonyl)amino]-2-phenylacetyl}-4-(methoxymethyl)-2-pyrrolidinyl]-1H-imidazol-4-yl}-1,11-dihydroisochromeno[4',3':6,7]naphtho[1,2-d]imidazol-2-yl)-5-methyl-1-pyrrolidinyl]-3-methyl-1-oxo-2-butanyl}carbamate
- CAS Number: 1377049-84-7
- PubChem CID: 67683363
- DrugBank: DB11613
- ChemSpider: 34501056
- UNII: KCU0C7RS7Z
- KEGG: D10806
- ChEBI: CHEBI:133009
- CompTox Dashboard (EPA): DTXSID70722565

Chemical and physical data
- Formula: C_{49}H_{54}N_{8}O_{8}
- Molar mass: 883.019 g·mol^{−1}
- 3D model (JSmol): Interactive image
- SMILES: COC[C@H]1C[C@@H](c2ncc(-c3ccc4c(c3)COc3cc5c(ccc6[nH]c([C@@H]7CC[C@H](C)N7C(=O)[C@@H](NC(=O)OC)C(C)C)nc65)cc3-4)[nH]2)N(C(=O)[C@H](NC(=O)OC)c2ccccc2)C1
- InChI: InChI=1S/C49H54N8O8/c1-26(2)41(54-48(60)63-5)47(59)57-27(3)12-17-38(57)45-51-36-16-14-30-20-35-33-15-13-31(19-32(33)25-65-40(35)21-34(30)43(36)53-45)37-22-50-44(52-37)39-18-28(24-62-4)23-56(39)46(58)42(55-49(61)64-6)29-10-8-7-9-11-29/h7-11,13-16,19-22,26-28,38-39,41-42H,12,17-18,23-25H2,1-6H3,(H,50,52)(H,51,53)(H,54,60)(H,55,61)/t27-,28-,38-,39-,41-,42+/m0/s1; Key:FHCUMDQMBHQXKK-CDIODLITSA-N

Velpatasvir is an NS5A inhibitor (by Gilead) which is used together with sofosbuvir in the treatment of hepatitis C infection of all six major genotypes.

== Side effects ==
Side effects in studies occurred with similar frequencies as in people treated with placebo.

== Interactions ==
Velpatasvir is both an inhibitor and a substrate of the transporter proteins P-glycoprotein (Pgp), ABCG2, OATP1B1 and OATP1B3. It is partly degraded by the liver enzymes CYP2B6, CYP2C8 and CYP3A4. Substances that are transported or inactivated by these proteins, or interfere with them, can interact with velpatasvir. In studies, this has been found for the HIV combination efavirenz/emtricitabine/tenofovir, which reduces the area under the curve (AUC) of velpatasvir by about 50%, and the CYP3A4 and Pgp inducer rifampicin, which reduces its AUC by about 80%, rendering it likely ineffective. Digoxin is eliminated by Pgp; its AUC is increased by about 30% in combination with velpatasvir and sofosbuvir (although it is not clear which of the two is responsible for this effect).

Substances that reduce gastric acid, such as antacids, H_{2} blockers, and proton pump inhibitors, reduce velpatasvir AUC by 20–40%.

== Pharmacology ==
=== Mechanism of action ===
The substance blocks NS5A, a protein necessary for hepatitis C virus replication and assembly.

=== Pharmacokinetics ===
Velpatasvir reaches highest blood plasma levels three hours after oral intake together with sofosbuvir. Plasma protein binding is over 99.5%. It is slowly metabolised by the liver enzymes CYP2B6, CYP2C8 and CYP3A4. While monohydroxylated and demethylated metabolites have been identified in human blood plasma and faeces, over 98% of the circulating substance is velpatasvir itself. 94% are excreted via the faeces, and only 0.4% via the urine. Biological half-life is about 15 hours.

== See also ==
- Discovery and development of NS5A inhibitors
- Sofosbuvir/velpatasvir/voxilaprevir, with more information about the drug combination
- Sofosbuvir/velpatasvir, with more information about the drug combination
