= Necrolytic acral erythema =

- Other names: Zinc-responsive necrolytic acral erythema
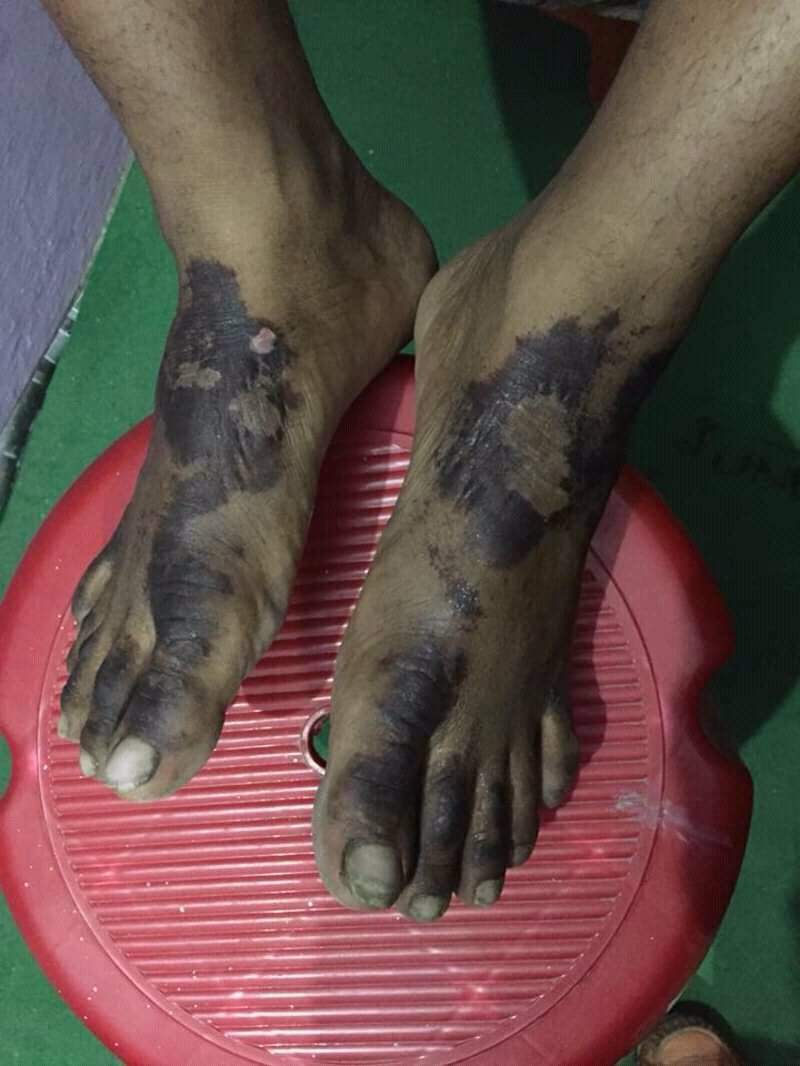
- Specialty: Dermatology

Necrolytic acral erythema is a cutaneous condition that is a manifestation of hepatitis C viral infection or zinc deficiency. In the early stages, bullae, erosions, and erythematous or violaceous papules are its defining characteristics. Well-defined plaques with erythema on the outer rim, lichenification, secondary hyperpigmentation, and fine desquamation on the surface begin to appear in the late phase.

== Signs and symptoms ==
Traditionally, necrolytic acral erythema manifests as distinct, dark red hyperkeratotic plaques with a keratotic border that are usually found on the dorsum of the foot and toes. Ankles, legs, and knees may also be affected in some cases. On occasion, lesions may appear on the buttocks, genitalia, hands, and elbows. It has been documented that the nails, palms, and soles, features typically thought of as distinguishing characteristics against necrolytic acral erythema, are affected. Necrolytic acral erythema can show clinically as either acute or chronic. Flaccid blisters, erosions at the margins, and noticeable erythema are the symptoms of acute lesions. The hyperkeratotic surface, moderate erythema, and dark red border are seen in the chronic lesions. Edema may be present in conjunction. The illness may have been present for two to one hundred and sixty months at the time of presentation.

Three stages characterize the evolution of necrolytic acral erythema lesions: early, well-developed, and late. Scaly, erythematous papules or plaques with a distinctively dark or worn center first emerge. When the lesions reach a well-developed stage, they combine to create a thick, hyperpigmented plaque that is clearly defined and has adhering scales. Sometimes there might be pustules. In the later stages, the lesions become thinner, more confined, and more pigmented. Lesions usually show a spontaneous remission and relapse pattern throughout time.

== Causes ==
As of yet, the precise etiology of necrolytic acral erythema remains unknown. Numerous causes, including hepatic dysfunction, hypoglucagonemia, hypoalbuminemia, hypoaminoacidemia, zinc deficiency, and diabetes with or without an underlying hepatitis C viral infection, have been postulated as part of the multifactorial pathophysiology of necrolytic acral erythema.

== Diagnosis ==
The biopsy site and illness stage are reflected in the histological characteristics. Early lesions from the margin display upper epidermal necrosis that has detached from the surrounding tissue in the form of blisters. Acanthosis, spongiosis, and a superficial dermal infiltration mimicking nummular dermatitis are observed in the epidermis. The well-developed lesions exhibit necrotic keratinocytes, psoriasiform hyperplasia, subcorneal pustules, significant papillomatosis, and parakeratosis. A fissure may occur in the top epidermis as a result of necrotic keratinocytes converging.

== Treatment ==
The most successful course of treatment to date has been oral zinc therapy.

== Epidemiology ==
Both sexes are equally affected by the illness; 46.2% of males and 53.8% of females are affected, respectively. Patients with necrolytic acral erythema fall into the 19–58 year age range, with a mean age of 44±11.3 and a median age of 50.

== See also ==
- List of cutaneous conditions
