= Trelagliptin =

Chemical compound

Clinical data
- Trade names: Zafatek, Wedica
- ATC code: None

Identifiers
- IUPAC name: 2-({6-[(3R)-3-Amino-1-piperidinyl]-3-methyl-2,4-dioxo-3,4-dihydro-1(2H)-pyrimidinyl}methyl)-4-fluorobenzonitrile
- CAS Number: 865759-25-7
- PubChem CID: 15983988
- DrugBank: DB15323
- ChemSpider: 13115365
- UNII: Q836OWG55H
- KEGG: D10178
- CompTox Dashboard (EPA): DTXSID00235678

Chemical and physical data
- Formula: C_{18}H_{20}FN_{5}O_{2}
- Molar mass: 357.389 g·mol^{−1}
- 3D model (JSmol): Interactive image
- SMILES: Cn1c(=O)cc(n(c1=O)Cc2cc(ccc2C#N)F)N3CCC[C@H](C3)N
- InChI: InChI=1S/C18H20FN5O2/c1-22-17(25)8-16(23-6-2-3-15(21)11-23)24(18(22)26)10-13-7-14(19)5-4-12(13)9-20/h4-5,7-8,15H,2-3,6,10-11,21H2,1H3/t15-/m1/s1; Key:IWYJYHUNXVAVAA-OAHLLOKOSA-N

Trelagliptin (trade name Trelaglip, Zafatek) is a pharmaceutical drug used for the treatment of type 2 diabetes (diabetes mellitus).Trelagliptin is an orally active dipeptidyl peptidase (DPP)-4 inhibitor developed by Takeda and approved in Japan and India for the treatment of type 2 diabetes mellitus. Zuventus Healthcare introduced Trelagliptin in India (2025) under the brand name Trelaglip®.

== Indications ==
It is a highly selective dipeptidyl peptidase-4 inhibitor that is typically used as an add on treatment when the first line treatment of metformin is not achieving the expected glycemic goals; though it has been approved for use as a first line treatment when metformin cannot be used.

== Spikes to Stability: Trelagliptin Minimizes Glycemic Variability ==
Trelagliptin, a once-weekly DPP-4 inhibitor, helps manage glycemic variability (GV) in type 2 diabetes. It works by prolonging the activity of incretins (GLP-1 and GIP), which enhances insulin secretion and suppresses glucagon release in a glucose-dependent manner. This action helps reduce postprandial hyperglycemia and smooth out daily blood glucose fluctuations. Continuous glucose monitoring shows improved glycemic stability with lower glucose variability. Trelagliptin also lowers the risk of hypoglycemia due to its glucose-dependent effects. By reducing GV, it helps prevent damage to blood vessels. This ultimately lowers the risk of cardiovascular complications in diabetic patients.

== Pharmacokinetics ==
Trelagliptin's uniquely designed structure enhances its chemical stability and resistance to metabolic degradation. It binds strongly to the DPP-4 enzyme, with a slow dissociation rate (~30 minutes), compared to sitagliptin (3.5 min) and vildagliptin (<2 min). This prolonged binding contributes to its sustained DPP-4 inhibition. Trelagliptin has a long elimination half-life of approximately 54.3 hours. A 100 mg once-weekly dose maintained 77.4% DPP-4 inhibition 7 days post-dose. The drug reaches steady-state plasma levels (20.00–21.60 ng/mL) by week 4. These properties support its effective once-weekly dosing regimen.

== Biochemistry ==
DPP-4 inhibitors activate T-cells and are more commonly known as T-cell activation antigens (specifically CD26). Chemically, it is a fluorinated derivative of alogliptin.

== Development ==
Formulated as the salt trelagliptin succinate, it was approved for use in Japan in March 2015. Takeda, the company that developed trelagliptin, chose to not get approval for the drug in the US and EU. The licensing rights that Takeda purchased from Furiex Pharmaceuticals for DPP-4 inhibitors included a clause specific to development of this drug in the US and EU. The clause required that all services done for phase II and phase III clinical studies in the US and EU be purchased through Furiex. Takeda chose to cease development of this drug in the US and EU because of the high costs quoted by Furiex for these services. Gliptins have been on the market since 2006 and there are 8 gliptins currently registered as drugs (worldwide). Gliptins are an emerging market and are thus being developed at an increasing rate; there are currently two gliptins in advanced stages of development that are expected to be on the market in the coming year.

Gliptins are thought to have cardiovascular protective abilities though the extent of these effects is still being studied. They are also being studied for the ability that this class of drugs has at promoting B-cell survival.

== Administration and dosing ==
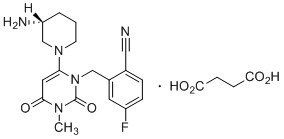
Chemical structure of trelagliptin succinate

Typically, for adults, 100 mg trelagliptin is given orally once a week. Similar drugs in the same class as trelagliptin are administered once daily while trelagliptin is administered once weekly. A dosing of once per week is advantageous as a reduction in the frequency of required dosing is known to increase patient compliance. A recent meta-analysis published by Dutta et al. highlighted the good glycaemic efficacy and safety of this molecule as compared to peer DPP4 inhibitors which have to be taken daily like alogliptin, sitagliptin, linagliptin, teneligliptin, anagliptin or vildagliptin, having an advantage of reducing the monthly pill count from 30 to 4.

== Trelagliptin versus Vildagliptin in Indian patients ==
Dewan et al. (2025) conducted a phase 3 randomized trial comparing once-weekly trelagliptin with twice-daily vildagliptin in Indian patients with type 2 diabetes. Trelagliptin was found to be non-inferior to vildagliptin in reducing HbA1c over 16 weeks. Both treatments showed comparable efficacy in improving glycemic parameters. Notably, a slightly higher proportion of patients on trelagliptin achieved HbA1c <7% compared to vildagliptin. Adverse events were mild and similar between groups. Trelagliptin demonstrated effective glycemic control with a favorable safety profile and the added benefit of convenient once-weekly dosing.

== Hepatic Impairment ==
No dose adjustment is required, as hepatic metabolism does not significantly affect the drug's pharmacokinetics. Trelagliptin is not significantly metabolized by the liver, so hepatic function has minimal impact on its pharmacokinetics and most of the drug is excreted unchanged in urine.

== Renal Impairment ==
- Dose adjustment is necessary based on the degree of renal function:
  - Mild Renal Impairment (eGFR ≥ 60 mL/min/1.73 m²): No dose adjustment required.
  - Moderate Renal Impairment (eGFR 30–59 mL/min/1.73 m²): Reduce dose to 50 mg once weekly.
  - Severe Renal Impairment or ESRD (eGFR < 30 mL/min/1.73 m² or on dialysis): Reduce dose to 25 mg once weekly, with close monitoring.

== Brand names ==
The drug is marketed under various names globally Trelaglip (India, Zuventus Healthcare), ONETRELA (India, ALKEM LABS)Zafatek (Japan and China, Takeda Pharmaceuticals), Wedica and Triliptin (Bangladesh), Truli-1 (Kenya), Trelaget (Pakistan), and TRELA (Myanmar and Cambodia).
