= Peginterferon-alfa =

Peginterferon-alfa may refer to:

- Peginterferon alfa-2a, an antiviral drug used in treatment for hepatitis C and hepatitis B
- Peginterferon alfa-2b, a treatment for hepatitis C

== See also ==
- Interferon
