= Kazi Md. Anowar Hossain =

Bangladeshi politician (1955–2017)

Member of Bangladesh Parliament

Personal details
- Born: 1955 Brahmanbaria
- Died: 3 March 2017 (aged 61–62) Apollo Hospital Dhaka
- Party: Jatiya Party
- Other political affiliations: Bangladesh Nationalist Party (2001-2006)

Kazi Md. Anowar Hossain (1955–2017) was a Bangladeshi politician and a member of parliament for Brahmanbaria-5.

== Career ==
Hossain was elected to parliament from Brahmanbaria-5 as a Jatiya Party (Ershad) candidate in 1986, 1988, and 1991, and as a Bangladesh Nationalist Party candidate in 2001.

== Death ==
Kazi Md. Anowar Hossain died on 3 March 2017 in Apollo Hospital Dhaka, Bangladesh.
