= Acylsulfonamide =

Functional group in organic chemistry

Chemical structure of a generic acylsulfonamide

Acylsulfonamide is a functional group in organic chemistry that is sometimes used in medicinal chemistry. It consists of a sulfonamide group (SO_{2}NH) linked to an acyl group (RCO), forming the structure R−CO−NH−SO_{2}−R′. This moiety is found in several biologically active molecules and marketed drugs, serving as a useful pharmacophore. Acylsulfonamides are of particular interest due to their ability to act as bioisosteres of carboxylic acids, offering similar hydrogen bonding capabilities and comparable pKa values (typically between 3.5 and 4.5). They are incorporated in various drugs candidates targeting conditions such as bacterial infections, pain, and cancer.

== Examples ==
The following are approved drugs that contain the acylsulfonamide functional group:

- Elexacaftor
- Grazoprevir
- Parecoxib
- Selexipag
- Simeprevir
- Sulfacetamide
- Sulfadicramide
- Sulfisoxazole acetyl
- Vaniprevir
- Venetoclax
- Voxilaprevir
- Zafirlukast

Several investigational new drugs contain also the acylsulfonamide functional group. Examples include:

- Asunaprevir
- Danoprevir
- Glecaprevir
- Navitoclax
- Paritaprevir
- Sulprostone
