= Beclabuvir =

Chemical compound

Clinical data
- Other names: BMS-791325

Legal status
- Legal status: US: Investigational New Drug

Identifiers
- IUPAC name: (1aR,12bS)-8-Cyclohexyl-N-(dimethylsulfamoyl)-11-methoxy-1a-{[(1R,5S)-3-methyl-3,8-diazabicyclo[3.2.1]oct-8-yl]carbonyl}-1,1a,2,12b-tetrahydrocyclopropa[d]indolo[2,1-a] [2]benzazepine-5-carboxamide
- CAS Number: 958002-33-0
- PubChem CID: 56934415
- ChemSpider: 27289076
- UNII: MYW1X5CO9S
- KEGG: D10610
- CompTox Dashboard (EPA): DTXSID701026084

Chemical and physical data
- Formula: C_{36}H_{45}N_{5}O_{5}S
- Molar mass: 659.85 g·mol^{−1}
- 3D model (JSmol): Interactive image
- SMILES: CN1C[C@H]2CC[C@@H](C1)N2C(=O)[C@]34C[C@H]3c5cc(ccc5-c6c(c7ccc(cc7n6C4)C(=O)NS(=O)(=O)N(C)C)C8CCCCC8)OC
- InChI: InChI=1S/C36H45N5O5S/c1-38(2)47(44,45)37-34(42)23-10-14-28-31(16-23)40-21-36(35(43)41-24-11-12-25(41)20-39(3)19-24)18-30(36)29-17-26(46-4)13-15-27(29)33(40)32(28)22-8-6-5-7-9-22/h10,13-17,22,24-25,30H,5-9,11-12,18-21H2,1-4H3,(H,37,42)/t24-,25+,30-,36-/m0/s1; Key:ZTTKEBYSXUCBSE-QDFUAKMASA-N

Beclabuvir (also known by the research name BMS-791325; abbreviated BCV) is an antiviral drug for the treatment of hepatitis C virus (HCV) infection that has been studied in clinical trials. In February 2017, Bristol-Myers Squibb began sponsoring a post-marketing trial of beclabuvir, in combination with asunaprevir and daclatasvir, to study the combination's safety profile with regard to liver function. From February 2014 to November 2016, a phase II clinical trial was conducted on the combination of asunaprevir/daclatasvir/beclabuvir (beclabuvir is referred to as BMS-791325 in the trial) on patients infected with both HIV and HCV. Furthermore, a recent meta-analysis of six published six clinical trials showed high response rates in HCV genotype 1-infected patients treated with daclatasvir, asunaprevir, and beclabuvir irrespective of ribavirin use, prior interferon-based therapy, or restriction on noncirrhotic patients, IL28B genotype, or baseline resistance-associated variants

== Pharmacology ==
Beclabuvir acts as a NS5B (RNA polymerase) inhibitor.
