= Daria Hazuda =

Biochemist

- Education: Rutgers University, State University of New York at Stony Brook
- Known for: developing first approved HIV integrase inhibitor
- Scientific career
- Fields: Biology, Biochemistry
- Workplaces: Merck

Daria J Hazuda is a biochemist known for discovering the first HIV Integrase Strand Transfer Inhibitors (InSTIs) and leading the development of the first HIV integrase inhibitor to gain FDA approval, Isentress (raltegravir). Her lab also determined these inhibitors' mechanism of action and ways the virus could develop resistance to them. Hazuda has also performed extensive research and led the development of antivirals for Hepatitis C Virus (HCV) including Elbasvir and Grazoprevir. She currently serves as Vice President for Infectious Diseases Discovery for Merck and Chief Scientific Officer of their MRL Cambridge Exploratory Science Center.

== Early life and education ==
Hazuda was raised in Hillsborough Township, New Jersey. Her father was an engineer and her mother worked in the regulatory-compliance division of Janssen Pharmaceutica (now a part of Johnson & Johnson). She graduated in 1977 as the salutatorian at Hillsborough High School. She initially pursued a premedical degree at Georgetown University, but fell in love with research during a part-time job in a lab and decided to go into drug discovery. She earned got a B.S. from Rutgers University, followed by a PhD in biochemistry from the State University of New York at Stony Brook, where she trained with Cheng-Wen Wu. She then did a post-doctoral research fellowship at Smith, Kline, and French in the department of Molecular Genetics.

== Career and research ==
Hazuda joined Merck in 1989, where she started as a Senior Research Biochemist in the antiviral research group. She was initially assigned to work on influenza, but she asked to be switched to HIV research. She continues to oversee Merck's HIV research, which includes the development of long-acting antiretrovirals. She has also been instrumental in the development of antiviral treatments for Hepatitis C Virus (HCV), leading the development of antivirals for Hepatitis C Virus (HCV) including Elbasvir and Grazoprevir. Additionally, as Chief Scientific Officer of the Merck Research Laboratory Cambridge Exploratory Science Center she oversees research on interactions between the human microbiome and immunity. She previously served as Global Director of Scientific Affairs for Antivirals in Merck's division of Global Human Health, as well as co-site head of basic research for the Merck West Point research facility.

Hazuda is on the editorial board of the American Chemical Society Journal on Anti-infectives Research and the Journal of Viral Eradication. She previously served on the scientific advisory boards of and the Center for Aids Research (CFAR) of UCLA and the Gladstone Institute as well as the NIH Aids Research Advisory Committee (ARAC). She is a member of The Forum for HCV Collaborative Research, the NCI Basic Sciences Board of Scientific Counselors, and the Scientific Program Advisory Council of the American Foundation for Aids Research (AMFAR).

=== Research on HIV-1 integrase inhibitors ===
As a retrovirus, HIV has an RNA genome which it reverse transcribes into a double-stranded DNA copy, which it then inserts into the host cell's genome. This insertion is done by an enzyme called integrase which has several sequential functions: it binds to the ends of the viral DNA and processes them by removing a couple of nucleotides from each end. It then aids the 3'OH of the viral DNA in attacking the phosphodiester backbone of the host DNA, cleaving it at an integration site and attaching the viral DNA in a step called strand transfer. Cellular enzymes then fill in the gaps.

Hazuda was not the first or only scientist working to develop integrase inhibitors. However, whereas most scientists were focused on blocking the early steps (and were not having much success), Hazuda focused on the later, strand transfer, step. In order to screen for inhibitors of this step, she had to develop a new assay, which involved viral "donor DNA" mimics attached to the wells of a plate and labeled target DNA. Integrase strand transfer activity was measured by the labeled DNA getting stuck to the well after unreacted products were washed off. The assay worked, but it was incompatible with the available robots, so she and two assistants, over several months in 1999, had to pipet over 250,000 compounds by hand.

In 2000, her group published two key papers showing effective integrase inhibitors could be made. She demonstrated that the inhibitors she had identified acted as Integrase Strand Transfer Inhibitor (InSTI), binding to viral DNA-bound integrase, chelating the active site magnesium ions, and thereby preventing the complex from binding to cellular DNA. Through a collaboration with Merck researchers in Rome, raltegravir (Isentress) was found - it was originally developed as a potential hepatitis C polymerase inhibitor which was found to be ineffective for that purpose. It was approved by the FDA for use in patients with HIV in October 2007.

== Honors and awards ==
Hazuda has received the Bernie Field Lecture Award and the David Barry DART (Development of Antiretroviral Therapies) Achievement Award. The integrase inhibitor she led the development of, Isentress (raltegravir), was awarded the Prix Galien prize in 2008. She was awarded the Italian Premio Galeno Award for this work. In 2019 she Ohio State University presented her with the Distinguished Research Career Award. In 2017, she was part of a team of chemists awarded the “Heroes of Chemistry” award from the American Chemical Society for the development of the HCV combination therapy Elbasvir/Grazoprevir. She was Elected as a Fellow to the American Academy of Microbiology in 2010.

== Key papers ==
- Hazuda, Daria J.; Felock, Peter; Witmer, Marc; Wolfe, Abigail; Stillmock, Kara; Grobler, Jay A.; Espeseth, Amy; Gabryelski, Lori; Schleif, William; Blau, Carol; Miller, Michael D. (2000-01-28). "Inhibitors of Strand Transfer That Prevent Integration and Inhibit HIV-1 Replication in Cells". Science. 287 (5453): 646–650. Bibcode:2000Sci...287..646H. doi:10.1126/science.287.5453.646. ISSN 0036-8075. PMID 10649997.
- Espeseth, Amy S.; Felock, Peter; Wolfe, Abigail; Witmer, Marc; Grobler, Jay; Anthony, Neville; Egbertson, Melissa; Melamed, Jeffrey Y.; Young, Steve; Hamill, Terence; Cole, James L. (2000-10-10). "HIV-1 integrase inhibitors that compete with the target DNA substrate define a unique strand transfer conformation for integrase". Proceedings of the National Academy of Sciences. 97 (21): 11244–11249. Bibcode:2000PNAS...9711244E. doi:10.1073/pnas.200139397. ISSN 0027-8424. PMC 17185. PMID 11016953.
- Grobler, Jay A.; Stillmock, Kara; Hu, Binghua; Witmer, Marc; Felock, Peter; Espeseth, Amy S.; Wolfe, Abigail; Egbertson, Melissa; Bourgeois, Michele; Melamed, Jeffrey; Wai, John S. (2002-05-14). "Diketo acid inhibitor mechanism and HIV-1 integrase: Implications for metal binding in the active site of phosphotransferase enzymes". Proceedings of the National Academy of Sciences. 99 (10): 6661–6666. Bibcode:2002PNAS...99.6661G. doi:10.1073/pnas.092056199. ISSN 0027-8424. PMC 124459. PMID 11997448.
