= Discovery and development of NS5A inhibitors =

Drug discovery

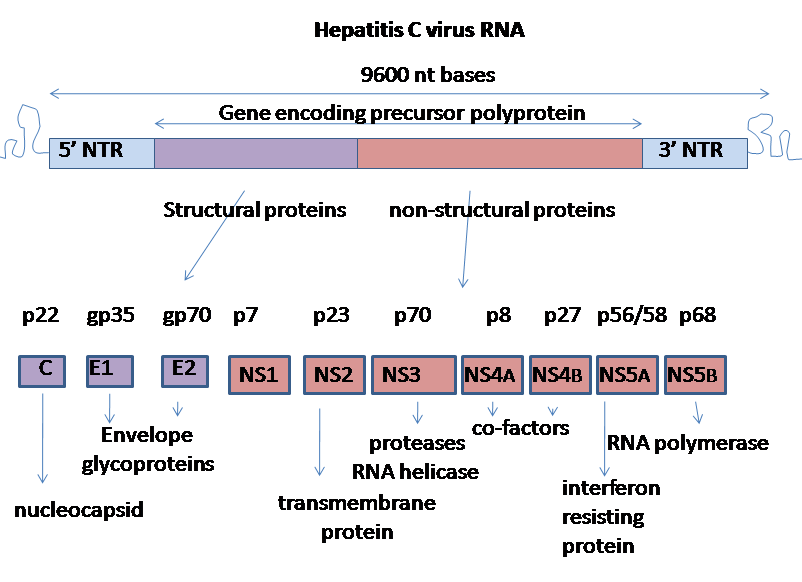
The HCV genome. NS5A in the bottom row, second from the right.

Nonstructural protein 5A (NS5A) inhibitors are direct acting antiviral agents (DAAs) that target viral proteins, and their development was a culmination of increased understanding of the viral life cycle combined with advances in drug discovery technology. However, their mechanism of action is complex and not fully understood. NS5A inhibitors were the focus of much attention when they emerged as a part of the first curative treatment for hepatitis C virus (HCV) infections in 2014. Favorable characteristics have been introduced through varied structural changes, and structural similarities between NS5A inhibitors that are clinically approved are readily apparent. Despite the recent introduction of numerous new antiviral drugs, resistance is still a concern and these inhibitors are therefore always used in combination with other drugs.

== Hepatitis C virus ==
HCV is a positive-sense single-stranded RNA virus that has been demonstrated to replicate in the hepatocytes of both humans and chimpanzees. A single HCV polyprotein is translated, and then cleaved by cellular and viral proteases into three structural proteins (core, E1, and E2) and seven nonstructural proteins (p7, NS2, NS3, NS4A, NS4B, NS5A, and NS5B).

HCV is among the leading causes of liver disease around the world. It is transmitted by blood and is most commonly contracted through the use of infected needles. Patients with chronic HCV infection are at significant risk of cirrhosis and hepatocellular carcinoma, which are the leading causes of death for those infected.

The virus has been around for over a millennium and has been classified into six known genotypes, each of which contains numerous subtypes. The seventh remains uncharacterized. The genotype contracted dictates which specific treatments are viable.

== NS5A receptor ==
=== Basic structure and chemical properties ===
NS5A is a large hydrophilic phosphoprotein that is essential for the HCV life cycle and is found in association with virus-induced membrane vesicles, termed the membranous web. NS5A is a proline-rich protein composed of approximately 447 amino acids, which is divided into three domains. These domains are linked by two low-complexity sequences that are either serine- or proline-rich. Domain I is a zinc binding domain and X-ray crystallography studies indicated alternative dimer conformations of domain I of NS5A. Domain II and III are unstructured, shown by NMR studies. Domain I is preceded by an N-terminal amphipathic helix which allows the protein to associate with endoplasmic reticulum-derived membranes. Although X-ray crystallographic studies revealed dimer conformations of NS5A domain1, recent in solution structural characterization studies showed that NS5A proteins form higher-order structures by dimeric subunits of NS5A domain 1. Moreover, the overall structural model of NS5A highlights the variability of intrinsic conformations of the D2 and D3 domains between HCV genotypes.

NS5A mainly exists in two distinct phosphorylated forms, a hypophosphorylated and a hyperphosphorylated form, but the exact function of the phosphorylation has not been determined.

=== Function ===
The NS5A protein plays an important role in viral RNA replication, viral assembly, and complex interactions with cellular functions. The protein has been implicated in the modulation of host defenses, apoptosis, the cell cycle, and stress-responsive pathways. However, its function and complete structure have yet to be elucidated.

NS5A seems to be key in triggering the formation of the membranous web in the absence of other similar nonstructural proteins. Many proteins within the host cell can be affected by NS5A, e.g. phosphatidylinositol 4-kinase IIIα (PI4KIIIα), a kinase required for the replication of HCV. This kinase takes part in the biosynthesis of phosphatidylinositol 4-phosphate (PI4P) by interacting with NS5A, which stimulates its activity and appears to improve the integrity of the membranous web.

Recently, the central role of NS5A in viral proliferation has made it the target for drug development. As a result, new antiviral agents have been introduced for the treatment of HCV.

== Mechanism of action ==
NS5A inhibitors have been developed to target the NS5A protein. These inhibitors have achieved a significant reduction in HCV RNA blood levels and can therefore be considered as potent antivirals. Their mechanism of action is thought to be diverse but the exact mechanism is not fully understood. Most studies assume that NS5A inhibitors act on two essential stages of the HCV life cycle; the replication of the genomic RNA, and virion assembly. Other studies propose an alteration of host cell factors as a possible third mechanism.

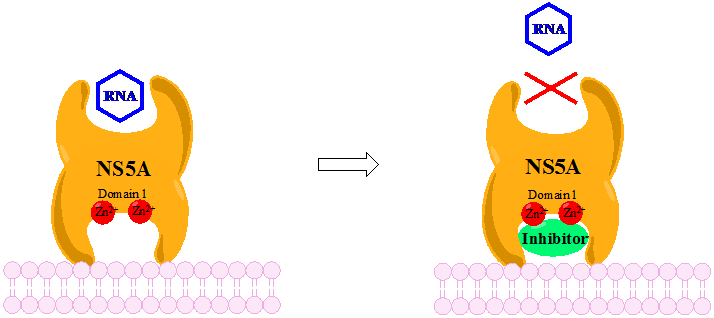
NS5A inhibitor's supposed mechanism of action. The inhibitor binds to NS5A domain 1 and prevents RNA from binding, therefore disrupting RNA replication.

The structure of NS5A inhibitors is characterized by dimeric symmetry. This suggests that NS5A inhibitors act on dimers of NS5A. A number of modeling studies have shown that daclatasvir, which is an NS5A inhibitor, only binds to the "back-to-back" NS5A dimer and that the binding has to be symmetrical. Other modeling studies have shown that binding to other conformations of NS5A might be possible, as well as asymmetrical binding. Research has shown that daclatasvir's target is most likely domain I of NS5A. Even though the mechanism is not completely understood, it has been demonstrated that the inhibitors downregulate NS5A hyperphosphorylation, leading to the suppression of HCV replication and its processing of polyproteins, as well as resulting in an unusual protein location. Hitherto, this inhibition was thought to require only NS5A domain I, but not domains II and III. However, recent studies have shown that both domains I and II are relevant to this disruption of RNA replication.

NS5A inhibitors appear to furthermore disrupt the formation of new replicase complexes resulting in a gradual slowing of viral RNA synthesis. Effect on previously formed complexes has yet to be demonstrated.

Available evidence suggests that NS5A inhibitors modify the location of NS5A inside the cell. This may cause abnormal assembly leading to malformed viruses. Some studies have revealed that inhibition of the viral assembly has a more important role in RNA reduction than viral replication reduction.

Studies have shown that NS5A inhibitors block the formation of the membranous web, which protects the viral genome and features the main sites for viral replication and assembly. This mechanism is thought to be independent of RNA replication, but seems to be affected by NS5A inhibitors blocking the formation of the PI4KIIIα-NS5A complex, essential to the synthesis of the PI4P, resulting in decreased integrity of the membranous web and therefore reduced HCV RNA replication.

== History ==
HCV research has taken great strides in recent years with the discovery and clinical development of multiple new HCV drugs. Among those drugs are the DAAs which include NS5A inhibitors. NS5A inhibitors have been found particularly effective in the treatment of HCV where they have been used in combination with protease inhibitors such as glecaprevir or NS5B inhibitors (e.g., sofosbuvir), pegylated interferons (e.g. peginterferon alfa-2a), and ribonucleic analogs (e.g. ribavirin). The ever present risk of viral strains developing resistance has been a main factor in why they are used in combination with one or more complementary drug.

Adverse effects, and extensive and complicated drug regimens with accompanying low compliance rates, have been a hindrance in the development of antiviral treatments. The combination of NS5A and NS5B inhibitors has produced positive results in this regard.

== Drug discovery and development ==
=== Discovery ===
There are currently (January, 2024) six NS5A inhibitors clinically approved, while there are many more in development or undergoing clinical trials. Daclatasvir was the first clinically approved NS5A inhibitor. Structural similarities can be seen between daclatasvir and the more recent inhibitors as shown in black with differences in pink. Daclatasvir was developed by Bristol-Myers Squibb, ledipasvir and velpatasvir by Gilead Sciences, ombitasvir and pibrentasvir by AbbVie Inc. and elbasvir by Merck & Co.

The discovery of NS5A inhibitors took place within the context of a pursuit for a treatment for HCV. NS5A is among the seven nonstructural proteins that form a complex with viral RNA within infected cells to initiate HCV replication. HCV research has produced several DAAs including NS3A, NS4A and NS5B inhibitors, as well as NS5A inhibitors.

=== Development ===
The development of antiviral drugs capable of interfering with the proteins responsible for viral replication has been intimately linked with advancements in techniques for establishing the efficient cell culture systems needed to screen for them.

In 1999 a breakthrough came when a full-length consensus genome cloned from HCV RNA was found to replicate at high levels when transfected into a human hepatoma cell line. This method has since been improved upon with the use of cell culture-adaptive mutations that enhance RNA replication.

Screening has now produced a number of NS5A inhibitors, which have been incorporated into treatments for HCV. The first in this new class of drugs was daclatasvir (Daklinza), gaining first global approval from the Japanese Ministry of Health, Labour and Welfare (MHLW) in July 2014 in combination with asunaprevir. Daclatasvir received FDA approval in July 2015. Other drugs have since been approved, among them notably the first FDA-approved NS5A inhibitor ledipasvir, approved October 2014 in combination with sofosbuvir to comprise the HCV drug Harvoni.

Although NS5A inhibitors have proven effective antivirals, they must be used alongside complementary antiviral drugs due to how quickly they lead to the development of resistant mutations when given as a single agent. This has shaped the focus of NS5A inhibitor development, from which asymmetrical variants that metabolize into analogues with complementary resistance profiles have emerged, amongst other discoveries.

=== Structure-activity relationship ===
The structural similarities between the inhibitors are readily apparent. The appendages of the central core are typically symmetrical and have an imidazole-proline structure. The natural L-configuration of the proline derivatives was found to be critical for inhibition since the unnatural D-configuration had drastically weaker activity. The potency of the inhibitors was correspondingly sensitive to changes in the amine capping element. These observations suggest that the amine region of the molecules plays an important role in the inhibitory activity.

Favorable characteristics in an NS5A inhibitor include high potency and long plasma half-life in order to achieve a once-daily-dosage. Slightly asymmetrical appendages, as seen in ledipasvir, were found to have distinctive benefits for the optimization of inhibitor potency and pharmacokinetics. The structure of the central core changes the spacing and the projection of the appendages as well as the position of the lipophilicity in the central core, which affects inhibitory activity notably. Structures with fused central rings consistently show greater inhibitory activity, whereas less lipophilic central cores provide weaker activity. Symmetrical bis-imidazol structures, such as daclatasvir, experience a loss in potency when fluorene is substituted for the biaryl group. This substitution also gives rise to some serious stability problems. However, a smaller lipophilic connector such as difluoromethylene generates the most potent inhibitor in an asymmetrical structure. Additionally, it provides improved bioavailability and more favorable plasma half-life. There is also a remarkable increase in potency when phenyl is replaced with naphthyl as a central core. This increase is significantly higher in an asymmetrical structure than it is in a symmetrical structure. In asymmetrical structures, a difference in potency between the phenyl-alkyne inhibitors demonstrates the importance of the position of the lipophilicity. A more centrally located alkyne, which is a less lipophilic connector than phenyl, improves potency.

The effect of structural changes in the central core (represented as X) of a symmetrical benzimidazole-benzimidazole structure on inhibitory activity
Structure	Activity	
X	IC_{50} (nM)	Inhibitory activity
	>44	None
	>44	None
	11	Very weak
	1.7	Weak
	0.50	Moderate
	3.7	Weak
	0.11	Moderate
	0.20	Moderate

The effect of structural changes in the central core (represented as X) of an asymmetrical imidazole-benzimidazole structure on inhibitory activity
Structure	Activity	
X	IC_{50} (nM)	Inhibitory activity
	>44	None
	0.071	Moderate
	2.5	Weak
	0.38	Moderate
	0.20	Moderate
	0.17	Moderate
	0.040	Strong

The effect of structural changes in the central core (represented as X) of a symmetrical imidazole-biaryl-imidazole structure on inhibitory activity
Structure	Activity	
X	IC_{50} (nM)	Inhibitory activity
CH_{2}	0.094	Strong
CO	0.30	Moderate
C(CH_{3})_{2}	1.2	Weak

== Resistance ==
The potential HCV resistance against DAA drugs is a concern. Among the HCV quasispecies there are pre-existing variants with the potential to confer resistance to NS5A inhibitors without having any previous exposure to those drugs. Generally, the replication of these variants happens only in minute quantities, making them undetectable by current techniques. On the other hand, it is possible to selectively grow immune variants in the presence of NS5A inhibitors. HCV resistance is characterized by a certain escape pattern. This pattern is often associated with amino acid substitutions that confer upon the virus a robust drug resistance without impairing the viral fitness. It has been established that NS5A inhibitors possess a relatively low threshold for resistance, and variants that are associated with NS5A resistance have been shown to endure for up to six months in patients following treatment cessation. Therefore, combination therapies produce higher efficacy and shorter treatment periods.

== Future research and new generations of NS5A inhibitors ==
DAA developers face foreseeable challenges in the years to come. Therapeutic gaps for individuals with complicating conditions such as chronic kidney disease and cirrhosis will need to be bridged. Shorter therapies with milder side effects would yield greater adherence, and the ever-present spectre of drug resistance looms. The highly adaptive HCV has evolved into a number of different genotypes, all of which need to be adequately treated, preferably with pan-genotypic regimens.

Some of these challenges already have possible solutions in sight. The protease inhibitor ABT-493 and the next-generation NS5A inhibitor ABT-530 are considered active against all HCV genotypes, including the hard to treat genotype 3. In vitro, ABT-530 showed potency against the resistance associated variants which are immune to the first generations of NS5A inhibitors, including ledipasvir, daclatasvir and ombitasvir. Because this drug combination has the additional quality of being hepatically cleared, it holds the promise that patients with chronic kidney disease and HCV could receive a safe, non-sofosbuvir-based treatment in the near future.

At least three drug combinations for the treatment of HCV are in the pipeline to be approved in 2016-2017: Sofosbuvir in combination with velpatasvir, ABT-493 in combination with ABT-530, and grazoprevir in combination with elbasvir, of which velpatasvir, ABT-530 and elbasvir are NS5A inhibitors.

== See also ==
- NS5A
- Hepatitis C
- Protease inhibitor
- Discovery and development of HIV-protease inhibitors
- Viral replication
- Ledipasvir
- Daclatasvir
- Ombitasvir
- Elbasvir
