= Danoprevir =

Medication

Clinical data
- Other names: ITMN-191, RG-7227
- ATC code: None

Legal status
- Legal status: Investigational

Identifiers
- IUPAC name: (2R,6S,12Z,13aS,14aR,16aS)-6-[(tert-Butoxycarbonyl)amino]-14a-[N-(cyclopropanesulfonyl)carbamoyl]-5,16-dioxo- 1,2,3,5,6,7,8,9,10,11,13a,14,14a,15,16,16a-hexadecahydrocyclopropa[e]pyrrolo[1,2-a][1,4]diazacyclopentadecin-2-yl 4-fluoro-1,3-dihydro-2H-isoindole-2-carboxylate
- CAS Number: 850876-88-9
- PubChem CID: 56841889
- ChemSpider: 9460579
- UNII: 911Z9PCQ5F
- KEGG: D09884
- ChEMBL: ChEMBL2311191
- NIAID ChemDB: 488730
- PDB ligand: TSV (PDBe, RCSB PDB)

Chemical and physical data
- Formula: C_{35}H_{46}FN_{5}O_{9}S
- Molar mass: 731.84 g·mol^{−1}
- 3D model (JSmol)
- SMILES: CC(C)(C)OC(=O)N[C@@H]1CCCCC\C=C/[C@@H]2C[C@]2(NC(=O)[C@@H]3C[C@H](CN3C1=O)OC(=O)N4Cc5cccc(F)c5C4)C(=O)NS(=O)(=O)C6CC6
- InChI: InChI=1S/C35H46FN5O9S/c1-34(2,3)50-32(45)37-27-13-8-6-4-5-7-11-22-17-35(22,31(44)39-51(47,48)24-14-15-24)38-29(42)28-16-23(19-41(28)30(27)43)49-33(46)40-18-21-10-9-12-26(36)25(21)20-40/h7,9-12,22-24,27-28H,4-6,8,13-20H2,1-3H3,(H,37,45)(H,38,42)(H,39,44)/b11-7-/t22-,23-,27-,28+,35-/m1/s1; Key:ZVTDLPBHTSMEJZ-UPZRXNBOSA-N

Danoprevir (INN) is an orally available 15-membered macrocyclic peptidomimetic inhibitor of NS3/4A HCV protease. It contains acylsulfonamide, fluoroisoindole and tert-butyl carbamate moieties. Danoprevir is a clinical candidate based on its favorable potency profile against multiple HCV genotypes 1–6 and key mutants (GT1b, IC_{50} = 0.2–0.4 nM; replicon GT1b, EC_{50} = 1.6 nM). Danoprevir has been evaluated in an open-label, single arm clinical trial in combination with ritonavir for treating COVID-19 and favourably compared to lopinavir/ritonavir in a second trial.

== History ==
Danoprevir was initially developed by Array BioPharma then licensed to Roche for further development and commercialization. In 2013, Danoprevir was licensed to Ascletis by Roche for development and production in China under the tradename Ganovo.
