= Elbasvir/grazoprevir =

Two drug combination for the treatment of hepatitis C

Combination of
- Elbasvir: NS5A inhibitor
- Grazoprevir: NS3/4A protease inhibitor

Clinical data
- Trade names: Zepatier
- AHFS/Drugs.com: zepatier
- License data: US DailyMed: Elbasvir and grazoprevir
- Routes of administration: By mouth
- ATC code: J05AP54 (WHO)

Legal status
- Legal status: AU: S4 (Prescription only); CA: ℞-only; US: ℞-only; EU: Rx-only

Identifiers
- CAS Number: 1878212-93-1
- PubChem CID: 91669168
- KEGG: D10778

Elbasvir/grazoprevir, sold under the brand name Zepatier, is a fixed-dose combination for the treatment of hepatitis C, containing elbasvir (an inhibitor of hepatitis C virus's NS5A protein) and grazoprevir (an NS3/4A inhibitor). It is used to treat chronic hepatitis C virus (HCV) genotypes 1 or 4 infection in both treatment-naïve and treatment-experienced patients.

Both elbasvir and grazoprevir were developed by Merck & Co. The US Food and Drug Administration (FDA) approved the drug in January 2016.

== Medical uses ==
Elbasvir/grazoprevir received FDA approval in January 2016. Its indication is for treatment of chronic hepatitis C of the genotypes 1 and 4 for adults. Hepatitis C is a global disease that infects upwards of 150 million people worldwide, especially in older generations. Hepatitis C causes inflammation of the liver that eventually leads to diminished liver function or even failure. Zepatier is indicated for treatment with or without use of ribavirin, as well. Zepatier has shown enough efficacy to be considered a first line of treatment for first-time patients with GT 1a and 1b, with or without cirrhosis. It is recommended for non-naive patients of the same genotypes, in addition to patients of GT4.

== Interactions and contraindications ==
Grazoprevir is transported by the solute carrier proteins SLCO1B1 and SLCO1B3. Drugs that inhibit this proteins, such as rifampicin, ciclosporin, and a number of HIV medications (atazanavir, darunavir, lopinavir, saquinavir, tipranavir, cobicistat), can cause a significant increase in grazoprevir blood plasma levels. Combination of elbasvir/grazoprevir with these drugs is therefore contraindicated.

Both elbasvir and grazoprevir are degraded by the liver enzyme CYP3A4. Combination with drugs that induce this enzyme, such as efavirenz, carbamazepine or St. John's wort, is contraindicated because it can lead to ineffectively low plasma levels of elbasvir and grazoprevir. Combination with CYP3A4 inhibitors may increase plasma levels and is not recommended by the manufacturer.

== Side effects ==
Common side effects during treatment include feeling tired, nausea, reduced appetite, and headache. Low red blood cell count has occurred when co-administered with ribavirin in some cases. The most important risks are Alanine transaminase elevation, hyperbilirubinemia, drug resistance development and drug interactions.

== Pharmacology ==
=== Mechanism of action ===
Elbasvir targets the NS5A protein, which effectively prevents the transcription of the HCV RNA and also prevents virion assembly. "Median EC50 values range from 0.2 to 3600 pmol/L, based on genotype." Grazoprevir is an protease inhibitor targeting HCV NS3/4A serine protease. Effectively grazoprevir prevents cleavage of the necessary polyproteins for replication.

== Clinical studies ==
A C-SALVAGE Phase 2 trial on safety and efficacy was reported in 2015. One randomized, open-label study was done on patients that had previous failure of a ribavirin/peginterferon treatment. SVR24 occurred in 96% of the patients with only 3 individuals relapsing.

Additional phase II trials were examined under the names: C-SWIFT, C-WORTHY, and C-WORTHY Coinfection. The first trial studied shorter dosing periods of 4, 6, or 8 weeks. C-SWIFT showed that the longer the time of treatment, the better the SVR results among patients. The C-WORTHY study combined elbasvir with grazoprevir and additionally ribavirin in cases of cirrhosis. This demographic of patients is the most treatment refractory and the study showed that the ribavirin did not improve effects. The C-WORTHY Coinfection trial studied patients with HCV and HIV. Treatments of monoinfected patients and coinfected patients resulted in better SRV12 for the patients with coinfection and treated with ribrivin, too, at 97%.

Phase III study results of the drug were released in 2016. Results from the C-EDGE IBLD trial show high rates of sustained virological response (SVR) after the completion of the prescribed treatment. This was examined 12-weeks after (SRV12). Safety profiles were consistent with previous studies. This study was a randomized, double-blind and placebo-controlled. 93% of the patients included in these studies showed SVR12 and had been cured of the virus.

The C-EDGE CO-STAR trial showed high SVR after 24-weeks. This study reaffirmed results from studies of the previous year. The study was double-blind and placebo-controlled. Patients had HCV GT1, GT4, or GT6 and were on opioid therapy. Upwards of 96% of the patients achieved SVR24. This study contributed to the knowledge of the incidence of HCV reinfection in patients who receive drug injection of opioid treatments. This is a demographic that the medical community is typically reluctant to treat due to concerns of reinfection and compliance.

== Society and culture ==
=== Patents ===
U.S. Patent No. 8871759 was published in 2014 for the specified compounds useful for hepatitis C virus NS5A inhibitors. The patent protects Merck's formulation for the drug and its other associated salt forms, hydrates, solvates, prodrugs and isomers. U.S. Patent No. 7973040 was published in 2011. The patent protects the invention by Merck of the macrocyclic compound within the formula as an inhibitor for NS3 protease. The patent describes the formulation of the compound and its salts, along with its uses and potential implications as an HCV antiviral treatment.

=== Commercialization ===
Elbasvir/grazoprevir was FDA approved in the United States, and has been approved for use in the European Union, Canada, Japan, Australia, Saudi Arabia, Israel, and Switzerland. Zepatier is one of a few non-interferon therapies that are market-available. Competing treatments include Gilead's Harvoni (sofosbuvir and ledipasvir) and AbbVie's Viekira Pak (ombitasvir, paritaprevir, and ritonavir). Sale projections for Zepatier are $636 million in 2016 and rising to $1.5 billion by 2020. With Merck's release of Zepatier early in 2016, they saw large bumps in share prices in quarters 1 and 2, but are expected to drop down a bit. Zepatier does not have as strong a market hold as other competitive HCV treatments.

=== Economics ===
Estimated costs for a 12-week treatment of elbasvir/grazoprevir are upwards of $54,600. Other treatments that work in a similar manner have effectively more costs. Some treatments for Hepatitis C are on the cheaper side, in some instances as low as $8,400. Additional ribavirin costs can add between $500 and $900. These cheaper prescriptions are however interferon-based treatments and do not target every genotype of the HCV. These regimens were the priority treatment before 2011. Two examples of these treatments are alfa-2a and alfa-2b costing $9250 and $8400, respectively.
