= Sovaprevir =

Chemical compound

Clinical data
- Other names: ACH-1625
- ATC code: None

Legal status
- Legal status: Investigational

Identifiers
- IUPAC name: (4R)-N-{(1R,2S)-1-[(Cyclopropylsulfonyl)carbamoyl]-2-vinylcyclopropyl}-1-{(2S)-3,3-dimethyl-2-[2-oxo-2-(1-piperidinyl)ethyl]butanoyl}-4-[(7-methoxy-2-phenyl-4-quinolinyl)oxy]-L-prolinamide
- CAS Number: 1001667-23-7
- PubChem CID: 53362096
- ChemSpider: 28529313
- UNII: 2ND9V3MN6O
- KEGG: D10166
- ChEMBL: ChEMBL2105750
- NIAID ChemDB: 491583
- CompTox Dashboard (EPA): DTXSID00142994

Chemical and physical data
- Formula: C_{43}H_{53}N_{5}O_{8}S
- Molar mass: 799.98 g·mol^{−1}
- 3D model (JSmol): Interactive image
- SMILES: CC(C)(C)[C@H](CC(=O)N1CCCCC1)C(=O)N2C[C@@H](C[C@H]2C(=O)N[C@@]3(C[C@H]3C=C)C(=O)NS(=O)(=O)C4CC4)OC5=CC(=NC6=C5C=CC(=C6)OC)C7=CC=CC=C7
- InChI: InChI=1S/C43H53N5O8S/c1-6-28-25-43(28,41(52)46-57(53,54)31-16-17-31)45-39(50)36-22-30(26-48(36)40(51)33(42(2,3)4)23-38(49)47-19-11-8-12-20-47)56-37-24-34(27-13-9-7-10-14-27)44-35-21-29(55-5)15-18-32(35)37/h6-7,9-10,13-15,18,21,24,28,30-31,33,36H,1,8,11-12,16-17,19-20,22-23,25-26H2,2-5H3,(H,45,50)(H,46,52)/t28-,30-,33-,36+,43-/m1/s1; Key:MHFMTUBUVQZIRE-WINRQGAFSA-N

Sovaprevir (codenamed ACH-1625) is an experimental drug designed to treat the hepatitis C virus. It is under development by Achillion Pharmaceuticals. It acts as a NS3/4A inhibitor. Sovaprevir received fast track status from the U.S. Food and Drug Administration in 2012.
