= HCV in children and pregnancy =

Infections of the hepatitis C virus (HCV) in children and pregnant women are less understood than those in other adults. Worldwide, the prevalence of HCV infection in pregnant women and children has been estimated to 1-8% and 0.05-5% respectively. The vertical transmission rate has been estimated to be 3-5% and there is a high rate of spontaneous clearance (25-50%) in the children. Higher rates have been reported for both vertical transmission (18%, 6-36% and 41%). and prevalence in children (15%).

In developed countries, transmission around the time of birth is now the leading cause of HCV infection. In the absence of virus in the mother's blood, transmission seems to be rare. Factors associated with an increased rate of infection include membrane rupture of longer than 6 hours before delivery and procedures exposing the infant to maternal blood. Cesarean sections are not recommended. Breastfeeding is considered safe if the nipples are not damaged. Infection around the time of birth in one child does not increase the risk in a subsequent pregnancy. All genotypes appear to have the same risk of transmission.

HCV infection is frequently found in children who have previously been presumed to have non-A, non-B hepatitis and cryptogenic liver disease. The presentation in childhood may be asymptomatic or with elevated liver function tests. While infection is commonly asymptomatic both cirrhosis with liver failure and hepatocellular carcinoma may occur in childhood.

== Diagnosis ==
Guidelines for the investigation of babies born to hepatitis C positive mothers have been published.

In children born to hepatitis C virus antibody positive but hepatitis C virus RNA negative mothers, the alanine aminotransferase and hepatitis C virus antibodies should be investigated at 18-24 months of life. If both the alanine aminotransferase value is normal and hepatitis C virus antibody is not found, follow up should be interrupted.
In children born to hepatitis C virus RNA positive mothers, alanine aminotransferase and hepatitis C virus RNA should be investigated at 3 months of age. Of these
(1) hepatitis C virus RNA positive children should be considered infected if viremia is confirmed by a second assay performed by the 12th month of age
(2) hepatitis C virus RNA negative children with abnormal alanine aminotransferase should be tested again for viremia at 6-12 months and for antibodies to the hepatitis C virus at 18 months
(3) hepatitis C virus RNA negative children with normal alanine aminotransferase should be tested for antibodies to the hepatitis C virus and have their alanine aminotransferase reestimated at 18-24 months. They should be considered non infected if both the alanine aminotransferase is normal and the antibody levels to the hepatitis C virus are undetectable.
The presence of anti hepatitis C virus antibody beyond the 18th month of age in a never viremic child with normal alanine aminotransferase is likely consistent with past hepatitis C virus infection.

== Treatment ==
Treatment of children was historically with interferon and ribavirin. The response to treatment was similar to that in adults. It showed a similar dependence on the genotype. Recurrence after transplant was universal and the outcomes after transplant were usually poor. Currently, the standard of care has shifted to all-oral direct-acting antivirals (DAAs) such as glecaprevir/pibrentavir and sofosbuvir/velpatasvir for children aged 3 and older, which offer much higher cure rates and fewer side effects.

Based on current protocol, perinatally exposed infants are typically screened using an HCV RNA test between 2 and 6 months of age. If active infection is confirmed, regular clinical monitoring is maintained without immediate intervention. Direct-acting antivirals are initiated once the child reaches 3 years of age
