= Mylab Discovery Solutions =

Indian biotechnology company

Mylab Discovery Solutions Pvt. Ltd.
- Type: Private
- Industry: Biotechnology
- Founded: 2016
- Headquarters: Pune, Maharashtra, India
- Area served: India
- Website: https://mylabglobal.com/

Mylab Discovery Solutions Pvt Ltd is an Indian biotechnology company that produces molecular ashish detection kits in the field of medical diagnostics, drug discovery, biomedical research, and agricultural genomics. It was founded in 2016 and is based in Pune. They were the first company in the country to make ID-NAT screening kits for quantitative HIV, Hepatitis B vaccine and Hepatitis C vaccines. The company by choice does not have any external investor and does not avail of government subsidies.

In March 2020 they developed the first made in India COVID-19 testing kit which has also been commercially approved by the Central Drugs Standard Control Organisation, Drug Controller General of India and Indian Council of Medical Research. The Mylab PathoDetect COVID-19 Qualitative PCR kit was developed in six weeks. "These (HIV, HBV, and HCV) are deadlier viruses than corona virus, and that experience helped us develop in record time," the founder said. Virologist Minal Dakhave Bhosale, who is MyLabs research and development chief, led the team.

In May 2021, ICMR approved Mylabs Covid home testing/self-testing kit.
