= Glecaprevir =

Chemical compound

Clinical data
- Trade names: Mavyret (combination with pibrentasvir)
- Other names: ABT-493
- Routes of administration: By mouth
- ATC code: None

Pharmacokinetic data
- Protein binding: 97.5%
- Metabolism: CYP3A
- Elimination half-life: 6 hours
- Excretion: Faeces (92.1%), urine (0.7%)

Identifiers
- IUPAC name: (3aR,7S,10S,12R,21E,24aR)-7-tert-Butyl-N-{(1R,2R)-2-(difluoromethyl)-1-[(1-methylcyclopropane-1-sulfonyl)carbamoyl]cyclopropyl}-20,20-difluoro-5,8-dioxo-2,3,3a,5,6,7,8,11,12,20,23,24a-dodecahydro-1H,10H-9,12-methanocyclopenta[18,19][1,10,17,3,6]trioxadiazacyclonon adecino[11,12-b]quinoxaline-10-carboxamide
- CAS Number: 1365970-03-1
- PubChem CID: 66828839
- DrugBank: DB13879
- ChemSpider: 35013015
- UNII: K6BUU8J72P
- KEGG: D10814
- CompTox Dashboard (EPA): DTXSID901027945

Chemical and physical data
- Formula: C_{38}H_{46}F_{4}N_{6}O_{9}S
- Molar mass: 838.87 g·mol^{−1}
- 3D model (JSmol): Interactive image
- SMILES: CC(C)(C)[C@@H]1NC(=O)O[C@@H]2CCC[C@H]2OC/C=C/C(F)(F)c2nc3ccccc3nc2O[C@@H]2C[C@@H](C(=O)N[C@]3(C(=O)NS(=O)(=O)C4(C)CC4)C[C@H]3C(F)F)N(C2)C1=O
- InChI: InChI=1S/C38H46F4N6O9S/c1-35(2,3)28-32(50)48-19-20(17-24(48)30(49)46-37(18-21(37)29(39)40)33(51)47-58(53,54)36(4)14-15-36)56-31-27(43-22-9-5-6-10-23(22)44-31)38(41,42)13-8-16-55-25-11-7-12-26(25)57-34(52)45-28/h5-6,8-10,13,20-21,24-26,28-29H,7,11-12,14-19H2,1-4H3,(H,45,52)(H,46,49)(H,47,51)/b13-8+/t20-,21+,24+,25-,26-,28-,37-/m1/s1; Key:MLSQGNCUYAMAHD-ITNVBOSISA-N

Glecaprevir (INN,) is a hepatitis C virus (HCV) nonstructural (NS) protein 3/4A protease inhibitor that was identified jointly by AbbVie and Enanta Pharmaceuticals. It is being developed as a treatment of chronic hepatitis C infection in co-formulation with an HCV NS5A inhibitor pibrentasvir. Together they demonstrated potent antiviral activity against major HCV genotypes and high barriers to resistance in vitro.

On 19 December 2016, AbbVie submitted a new drug application to the U.S. Food and Drug Administration for the glecaprevir/pibrentasvir (trade name Mavyret) regimen for the treatment of all major genotypes (1–6) of chronic hepatitis C. On 3 August 2017 the FDA approved the combination for hepatitis C treatment. In Europe, it was approved on 17 August 2017 for the same indication, under the trade name Maviret.

== See also ==
- Protease inhibitor (pharmacology)
