= Samatasvir =

Chemical compound

Clinical data
- Routes of administration: Oral

Legal status
- Legal status: Investigational

Identifiers
- IUPAC name: N-((1R)-2-((2S)-2-(5-(4-(6-(2-((2S)-1-((2S)-2-((methoxycarbonyl)amino)-3-methylbutanoyl)pyrrolidin-2-yl)-3H-benzimidazol-5-yl)thieno(3,2-b)thiophen-3-yl)phenyl)-1H-imidazol-2-yl)pyrrolidin-1-yl)-2-oxo-1-phenylethyl)carbamate
- CAS Number: 1312547-19-5
- PubChem CID: 53302707
- ChemSpider: 30843806
- UNII: 21P699C5FC
- KEGG: D10665
- CompTox Dashboard (EPA): DTXSID70156982

Chemical and physical data
- Formula: C_{47}H_{48}N_{8}O_{6}S_{2}
- Molar mass: 885.07 g·mol^{−1}
- 3D model (JSmol): Interactive image
- SMILES: CC(C)[C@@H](C(=O)N1CCC[C@H]1c2[nH]c3ccc(cc3n2)c4csc5c4scc5c6ccc(cc6)c7c[nH]c(n7)[C@@H]8CCCN8C(=O)[C@@H](c9ccccc9)NC(=O)OC)NC(=O)OC
- InChI: InChI=1S/C47H48N8O6S2/c1-26(2)38(52-46(58)60-3)44(56)55-21-9-13-37(55)43-49-33-19-18-30(22-34(33)50-43)32-25-63-40-31(24-62-41(32)40)27-14-16-28(17-15-27)35-23-48-42(51-35)36-12-8-20-54(36)45(57)39(53-47(59)61-4)29-10-6-5-7-11-29/h5-7,10-11,14-19,22-26,36-39H,8-9,12-13,20-21H2,1-4H3,(H,48,51)(H,49,50)(H,52,58)(H,53,59)/t36-,37-,38-,39+/m0/s1; Key:ATOLIHZIXHZSBA-BTSKBWHGSA-N

Samatasvir (IDX-719) is an experimental drug for the treatment of hepatitis C. It was originally developed by Idenix, and development has been continued by Merck & Co. following their acquisition of Idenix. Samatasvir has shown good results in Phase II trials.

Samatasvir is a highly potent and selective inhibitor of the hepatitis C virus NS5A replication complex. While it showed promising results when administered as monotherapy, it is probable that samatasvir would be marketed as a combination product with other anti-hepatitis drugs to increase efficacy and reduce the chance of resistance developing, as with most other novel treatments for hepatitis C currently under development. Trials of samatasvir in combination with other antiviral drugs such as simeprevir are also underway.

== See also ==
- Discovery and development of NS5A inhibitors
