= C38H46F4N6O9S =

The molecular formula C_{38}H_{46}F_{4}N_{6}O_{9}S (molar mass: 838.865 g/mol) may refer to:

- Glecaprevir
- Telotristat ethyl
