= Vaniprevir =

Chemical compound

Identifiers
- IUPAC name: (1R,21S,24S)-21-tert-butyl-N-[(1R,2R)-1-(cyclopropylsulfonylcarbamoyl)-2-ethylcyclopropyl]-16,16-dimethyl-3,19,22-trioxo-2,18-dioxa-4,20,23-triazatetracyclo[21.2.1.14,7.06,11]heptacosa-6(11),7,9-triene-24-carboxamide
- CAS Number: 923590-37-8
- PubChem CID: 24765256
- DrugBank: DB11929
- ChemSpider: 24651717
- UNII: CV3X74AO1H
- ChEBI: CHEBI:136047
- ChEMBL: ChEMBL4525964
- CompTox Dashboard (EPA): DTXSID201029738
- ECHA InfoCard: 100.207.830

Chemical and physical data
- Formula: C_{38}H_{55}N_{5}O_{9}S
- Molar mass: 757.94 g·mol^{−1}
- 3D model (JSmol): Interactive image
- SMILES: CC[C@@H]1C[C@@]1(C(=O)NS(=O)(=O)C2CC2)NC(=O)[C@@H]3C[C@@H]4CN3C(=O)[C@@H](NC(=O)OCC(CCCCC5=C6CN(CC6=CC=C5)C(=O)O4)(C)C)C(C)(C)C
- InChI: InChI=InChI=1S/C38H55N5O9S/c1-7-25-18-38(25,33(46)41-53(49,50)27-14-15-27)40-31(44)29-17-26-20-43(29)32(45)30(36(2,3)4)39-34(47)51-22-37(5,6)16-9-8-11-23-12-10-13-24-19-42(21-28(23)24)35(48)52-26/h10,12-13,25-27,29-30H,7-9,11,14-22H2,1-6H3,(H,39,47)(H,40,44)(H,41,46)/t25-,26-,29+,30-,38-/m1/s1; Key:KUQWGLQLLVFLSM-ONAXAZCASA-N

Vaniprevir (MK-7009) is a macrocyclic hepatitis C virus (HCV) NS3/4A protease inhibitor, developed by Merck & Co., which is currently in clinical testing. In Japan, it was approved for treating hepatitis C in 2014 under the brand name Vanihep.
