= Elbasvir =

Chemical compound

Clinical data
- Trade names: Zepatier (combination with grazoprevir)
- Other names: MK-8742
- License data: EU EMA: by INN
- Routes of administration: Oral
- ATC code: J05AP10 (WHO) J05AP54 (WHO) (combination with grazoprevir)

Legal status
- Legal status: In general: ℞ (Prescription only)

Pharmacokinetic data
- Protein binding: >99.9%
- Metabolism: CYP3A4
- Elimination half-life: 24 hours
- Excretion: >90% via faeces, <1% via urine

Identifiers
- IUPAC name: Dimethyl N,N’-([(6S)-6H-indolo[1,2-c][1,3]benzoxazine-3,10-diyl]bis{1H-imidazole-5,2-diyl-(2S)-pyrrolidine-2,1-diyl[(2S)-1-oxo-3-methylbutane-1,2-diyl]})biscarbamate
- CAS Number: 1370468-36-2
- PubChem CID: 71661251
- DrugBank: DB11574
- ChemSpider: 30843797
- UNII: 632L571YDK
- KEGG: D10625
- ChEBI: CHEBI:132967
- CompTox Dashboard (EPA): DTXSID10160043
- ECHA InfoCard: 100.234.242

Chemical and physical data
- Formula: C_{49}H_{55}N_{9}O_{7}
- Molar mass: 882.035 g·mol^{−1}
- 3D model (JSmol): Interactive image
- SMILES: CC(C)[C@@H](C(=O)N1CCC[C@H]1c2[nH]cc(n2)c3ccc4c(c3)cc-5n4[C@@H](Oc6c5ccc(c6)c7c[nH]c(n7)[C@@H]8CCCN8C(=O)[C@H](C(C)C)NC(=O)OC)c9ccccc9)NC(=O)OC
- InChI: InChI=1S/C49H55N9O7/c1-27(2)41(54-48(61)63-5)45(59)56-20-10-14-37(56)43-50-25-34(52-43)30-17-19-36-32(22-30)23-39-33-18-16-31(24-40(33)65-47(58(36)39)29-12-8-7-9-13-29)35-26-51-44(53-35)38-15-11-21-57(38)46(60)42(28(3)4)55-49(62)64-6/h7-9,12-13,16-19,22-28,37-38,41-42,47H,10-11,14-15,20-21H2,1-6H3,(H,50,52)(H,51,53)(H,54,61)(H,55,62)/t37-,38-,41-,42-,47-/m0/s1; Key:BVAZQCUMNICBAQ-PZHYSIFUSA-N

Elbasvir is a drug approved by the FDA in January 2016 for the treatment of hepatitis C. It was developed by Merck and completed Phase III trials, used in combination with the NS3/4A protease inhibitor grazoprevir under the trade name Zepatier, either with or without ribavirin.

Elbasvir is a highly potent and selective NS5A inhibitor of the hepatitis C virus NS5A replication complex. It has only been investigated as a combination product with other complementary hepatitis C antiviral drugs such as grazoprevir and MK-3682, and it is unclear whether elbasvir would show robust antiviral activity if it was administered by itself. Nevertheless, combination products of this type represent the most successful approach yet developed for actually curing hepatitis C, rather than merely slowing the progression of the disease.

== Side effects ==
Side effects have only been assessed in the combination with grazoprevir; see Elbasvir/grazoprevir#Side effects.

== Interactions ==
Elbasvir is degraded by the liver enzyme CYP3A4. Combination with drugs that induce this enzyme, such as efavirenz, carbamazepine or St. John's wort, can lead to ineffectively low plasma levels of elbasvir. Combination with CYP3A4 inhibitors may increase plasma levels.

== Pharmacology ==
=== Mechanism of action ===
The substance blocks NS5A, a protein necessary for hepatitis C virus replication and assembly.

=== Pharmacokinetics ===
Elbasvir reaches peak plasma concentrations three hours after oral intake together with grazoprevir (variation between patients: three to six hours). In hepatitis C patients, steady state concentrations are found after about six days. Plasma protein binding is over 99.9%, mainly to albumin and alpha-1-acid glycoprotein. Part of the substance is oxidised in the liver, largely by the enzyme CYP3A4. The biological half-life is 24 hours on average. Over 90% are excreted via the faeces, and less than 1% via the urine.
