= Odalasvir =

Chemical compound

Legal status
- Legal status: US: Investigational New Drug

Identifiers
- IUPAC name: Dimethyl N,N'-(1,4(1,4)-dibenzenacyclohexaphane- 1^{2},4^{2}-diylbis{1H-benzimidazole-5,2-diyl[(2S,3aS,7aS)- octahydro-1H-indole-2,1-diyl] [(2S)-3-methyl-1-oxobutan- 1,2-diyl]})biscarbamate
- CAS Number: 1415119-52-6
- PubChem CID: 71474517
- ChemSpider: 34500837
- UNII: OVR52K7BDW
- CompTox Dashboard (EPA): DTXSID401032258

Chemical and physical data
- Formula: C_{60}H_{72}N_{8}O_{6}
- Molar mass: 1001.286 g·mol^{−1}
- 3D model (JSmol): Interactive image
- SMILES: CC(C)[C@@H](C(=O)N1[C@H]2CCCC[C@H]2C[C@H]1C3=NC4=C(N3)C=C(C=C4)C5=C6CCC7=CC(=C(CCC(=C5)C=C6)C=C7)C8=CC9=C(C=C8)N=C(N9)[C@@H]1C[C@@H]2CCCC[C@@H]2N1C(=O)[C@H](C(C)C)NC(=O)OC)NC(=O)OC
- InChI: InChI=1S/C60H72N8O6/c1-33(2)53(65-59(71)73-5)57(69)67-49-13-9-7-11-41(49)31-51(67)55-61-45-25-23-39(29-47(45)63-55)43-27-35-15-19-37(43)21-17-36-16-20-38(22-18-35)44(28-36)40-24-26-46-48(30-40)64-56(62-46)52-32-42-12-8-10-14-50(42)68(52)58(70)54(34(3)4)66-60(72)74-6/h15-16,19-20,23-30,33-34,41-42,49-54H,7-14,17-18,21-22,31-32H2,1-6H3,(H,61,63)(H,62,64)(H,65,71)(H,66,72)/t41-,42-,49-,50-,51-,52-,53-,54-/m0/s1; Key:LSYBRGMTRKJATA-IVEWBXRVSA-N

Odalasvir (INN, previously known as ACH-3102) is an investigational new drug in development for the treatment of hepatitis C. It is an NS5A inhibitor. The NS5A protein serves multiple functions at various stages of the viral life cycle, including viral replication. NS5A also plays a role in the development of interferon-resistance, a common cause of treatment failure. It is under development by Achillion Pharmaceuticals.

== See also ==
- Discovery and development of NS5A inhibitors
