= Stockpiling antiviral medications for pandemic influenza =

An antiviral stockpile is a reserve supply of essential antiviral medications in case of shortage. Many countries have chosen to stockpile antiviral medications against pandemic influenza. Because of the time required to prepare and distribute an influenza vaccine, these stockpiles are the only medical defense against widespread infection for the first six months. The stockpiles may be in the form of capsules or simply as the active pharmaceutical ingredient, which is stored in sealed drums and, when needed, dissolved in water to make a bitter-tasting, clear liquid.

There are no evidence-based guidelines to guide the use of these stockpiled drugs, and plans are based on assumed similarities to seasonal influenza. The most common antivirals are neuraminidase inhibitors, which, if begun during the first 48 hours after symptoms appear, will reduce the duration of seasonal influenza by about one day. Taken before symptoms appear, it may prevent disease in about three-quarters of people treated prophylactically. Currently, this is recommended in institutionalized elderly people and other high-risk groups as a form of post-exposure prophylaxis during seasonal influenza outbreaks. However, since pandemic influenza differs somewhat from normal seasonal influenza, it is not clear that these drugs will prove either safe or effective for their intended purpose.

For a person who has very recently been exposed to seasonal influenza, effective post-exposure prophylaxis generally requires taking a drug like oseltamivir for seven to ten days, at half the daily dose needed for treatment. A person that is repeatedly exposed, such as hospital staff members, may require continuous treatment throughout the duration of the outbreak in a community. Based on experience with seasonal influenza in nursing homes, control of influenza requires full treatment of any ill persons and prophylactic treatment of all their contacts. In a pandemic situation, before a vaccine becomes available, this level of treatment and medical prevention may require providing drugs to 80% of the people in an affected community. Consequently, very large supplies of the drugs must be made available — much larger supplies than could be produced on demand. Stockpiles are generally arranged in advance by government health authorities, due to fear of shortages and an awareness of manufacturing limitations during an outbreak.

== Supplies in each country ==
List of available treatments of antiviral per country.

Rank	Country / Territory	Population	Treatments	Date Last Updated	Source
1	China	1,337,722,000			
2	India	1,420,460,000			
3	United States	338,863,000	50,000,000	April 27, 2009	Bloomberg.com; Report of antiviral stockpile sales
4	Indonesia	230,014,115			
5	Brazil	232,964,808			
6	Pakistan	166,146,000			
7	Bangladesh	162,221,000			
8	Nigeria	154,729,000			
9	Russia	141,833,393			
10	Japan	127,630,000	47,700,000	November 27, 2017	Ministry of Health, Labour and Welfare
11	Mexico	109,610,000			
12	Philippines	92,226,600			
13	Vietnam	88,069,000			
14	Germany	82,062,200			
15	Ethiopia	79,221,000			
16	Egypt	76,030,000			
17	Turkey	71,517,100			
18	Iran	70,495,782			
19	Dem. Rep. of Congo	66,020,000			
20	France	65,073,482			
21	Thailand	63,389,730			
22	United Kingdom	61,612,300	30,000,000	April 28, 2009	BBC News; Swine flu: How serious a threat?
23	Italy	60,090,400			
24	Myanmar	50,020,000			
25	South Africa	48,697,000			
26	South Korea	48,333,000	21,100,000	August 21, 2009	The Korea Times; More Flu Virus Vaccines to Be Stockpiled
27	Ukraine	46,143,700			
28	Spain	45,853,000			
29	Colombia	44,830,423			
30	Tanzania	43,739,000			
31	Sudan	42,272,000			
32	Kenya	39,802,000			
33	Argentina	39,745,613			
34	Poland	38,130,300			
35	Algeria	34,895,000			
36	Canada	33,476,688	1,400,000	April 27, 2009	Bloomberg.com; Report of Antiviral Stockpile Sales
37	Uganda	32,710,000			
38	Morocco	31,394,044			
39	Iraq	30,747,000			
40	Nepal	29,331,000			
41	Peru	29,165,000			
42	Venezuela	28,685,400			
43	Malaysia	28,200,000			
44	Afghanistan	28,150,000			
45	Uzbekistan	27,488,000			
46	Saudi Arabia	25,721,000			
47	North Korea	23,906,000			
48	Ghana	23,837,000			
49	Yemen	23,580,000			
50	Taiwan	23,027,672			
51	Mozambique	22,894,000			
52	Syria	21,906,000			
53	Australia	21,745,000			
54	Romania	21,496,700			
55	Côte d'Ivoire	21,075,000			
56	Sri Lanka	20,238,000			
57	Madagascar	19,625,000			
58	Cameroon	19,522,000			
59	Angola	18,498,000			
60	Chile	19,670,000	950,000	June 6, 2009	Ministerio de Salud de Chile; Nueva Influenza Humana A (H1N1)
61	Netherlands	16,508,734			
62	Burkina Faso	15,757,000			
63	Kazakhstan	15,571,506			
64	Niger	15,290,000			
65	Malawi	15,263,000			
66	Guatemala	14,027,000			
67	Ecuador	13,938,115			
68	Cambodia	13,388,910			
69	Mali	13,010,000			
70	Zambia	12,935,000			
71	Senegal	12,534,000			
72	Zimbabwe	12,523,000			
73	Greece	11,262,500			
74	Chad	11,206,000			
75	Cuba	11,204,000			
76	Belgium	10,741,000	3,000,000	1 Jan. 2007	Influenza
77	Portugal	10,631,800			
78	Czech Republic	10,474,600			
79	Tunisia	10,327,800			
80	Dominican Republic	10,090,000			
81	Guinea	10,069,000			
82	Haiti	10,033,000			
83	Hungary	10,029,900			
84	Rwanda	9,998,000			
85	Bolivia	9,863,000			
86	Serbia	9,850,000			
87	Belarus	9,690,000			
88	Sweden	9,264,000			
89	Somalia	9,133,000			
90	Benin	8,935,000			
91	Azerbaijan	8,629,900			
92	Austria	8,356,700			
93	Burundi	8,303,000			
94	Switzerland	7,705,800			
95	Bulgaria	7,602,100			
96	Honduras	7,466,000			
97	Israel	7,411,000			
98	Tajikistan	6,952,000			
99	Papua New Guinea	6,732,000			
100	Togo	6,619,000			
101	Libya	6,420,000			
102	Paraguay	6,349,000			
103	Laos	6,320,000			
104	Jordan	6,316,000			
105	El Salvador	6,163,000			
106	Nicaragua	5,743,000			
107	Sierra Leone	5,696,000			
108	Denmark	5,511,451			
109	Kyrgyzstan	5,482,000			
110	Slovakia	5,411,100			
111	Finland	5,333,089			
112	Turkmenistan	5,110,000			
113	Eritrea	5,073,000			
114	Singapore	4,839,400	500,000	April 28, 2009	Referenced. Confirmation expected.
115	Norway	4,814,075	1,400,000	April 28, 2009	
116	United Arab Emirates	4,599,000			
117	Costa Rica	4,579,000	3,000	April 28, 2009	Nacion.com (Spanish)
118	Ireland	4,517,800			
119	Croatia	4,432,000			
120	Central African Republic	4,422,000			
121	Georgia	4,382,100			
122	New Zealand	4,306,500			
123	Lebanon	4,224,000			
124	Puerto Rico (US)	3,982,000			
125	Liberia	3,955,000			
126	Bosnia and Herzegovina	3,767,000			
127	Palestine	3,761,646			
128	Republic of the Congo	3,683,000			
129	Moldova	3,572,700			
130	Panama	3,454,000			
131	Uruguay	3,361,000			
132	Lithuania	3,350,400			
133	Mauritania	3,291,000			
134	Armenia	3,230,100			
135	Albania	3,170,000			
136	Kuwait	2,985,000			
137	Oman	2,845,000			
138	Jamaica	2,719,000			
139	Mongolia	2,671,000			
140	Latvia	2,259,400			
141	Namibia	2,171,000			
142	Lesotho	2,067,000			
143	Slovenia	2,053,355			
144	North Macedonia	2,048,900			
145	Botswana	1,950,000			
146	Gambia	1,705,000			
147	Guinea-Bissau	1,611,000			
148	Gabon	1,475,000			
149	Qatar	1,409,000			
150	Estonia	1,340,341			
151	Trinidad and Tobago	1,339,000			
152	Mauritius	1,288,000			
153	Eswatini (Swaziland)	1,185,000			
154	East Timor	1,134,000			
155	Djibouti	864,000			
156	Fiji	849,000			
157	Cyprus	801,600			
158	Bahrain	791,000			
159	Guyana	762,000			
160	Bhutan	697,000			
161	Comoros	676,000			
162	Equatorial Guinea	676,000			
163	Montenegro	624,000			
164	Solomon Islands	523,000			
165	Suriname	520,000			
166	Western Sahara	513,000			
167	Cape Verde	506,000			
168	Luxembourg	491,700			
169	Malta	412,600			
170	Brunei	400,000			
171	Bahamas	342,000			
172	Iceland	319,326			
173	Maldives	309,000			
174	Belize	307,000			
175	Barbados	256,000			
176	Vanuatu	240,000			
177	Netherlands Antilles (Netherlands)	198,000			
178	Samoa	179,000			
179	Guam (US)	178,000			
180	Saint Lucia	172,000			
181	São Tomé and Príncipe	163,000			
182	Federated States of Micronesia	111,000			
183	U.S. Virgin Islands (US)	110,000			
184	Saint Vincent and the Grenadines	109,000			
185	Aruba (Netherlands)	107,000			
186	Grenada	104,000			
187	Tonga	104,000			
188	Kiribati	98,000			
189	Jersey (US)	89,300			
190	Antigua and Barbuda	88,000			
191	Northern Mariana Islands (US)	87,000			
192	Andorra	86,000			
193	Seychelles	84,000			
194	Isle of Man (UK)	80,000			
195	Dominica	67,000			
196	American Samoa (US)	67,000			
197	Bermuda (UK)	65,000			
198	Marshall Islands	62,000			
199	Guernsey (UK)	61,811			
200	Greenland (Denmark)	57,000			
201	Cayman Islands (UK)	56,000			
202	Saint Kitts and Nevis	52,000			
203	Faroe Islands (Denmark)	48,797			
204	Liechtenstein	35,700			
205	Monaco	33,000			
206	Turks and Caicos Islands (UK)	33,000			
207	San Marino	30,800			
208	Gibraltar (UK)	31,000			
209	British Virgin Islands (UK)	23,000			
210	Cook Islands (New Zealand)	20,000			
211	Palau	20,000			
212	Anguilla (UK)	15,000			
213	Tuvalu	10,000			
214	Nauru	10,000			
215	Saint Helena (UK)	6,600			
216	Montserrat (UK)	5,900			
217	Falkland Islands (UK)	3,000			
218	Niue (New Zealand)	1,500			
219	Tokelau (New Zealand)	1,400			
220	Vatican City	800			
221	Pitcairn Islands (UK)	50			
