= Double-stranded RNA activated caspase oligomerizer =

Group of antiviral drugs

DRACO (double-stranded RNA activated caspase oligomerizer) is a group of experimental antiviral drugs formerly under development at the Massachusetts Institute of Technology. In cell culture, DRACO was reported to have broad-spectrum efficacy against many infectious viruses, including dengue flavivirus, Amapari and Tacaribe arenavirus, Guama bunyavirus, H1N1 influenza and rhinovirus, and was additionally found effective against influenza in vivo in weanling mice. It was reported to induce rapid apoptosis selectively in virus-infected mammalian cells, while leaving uninfected cells unharmed.

As of January 2014, work had moved to Draper Laboratory for further testing and development; "the team looks forward to larger scale animal trials and clinical human trials within a decade or less". Dr. Todd Rider presented at the SENS Foundation's SENS6 conference. He left the Draper Laboratory in May 2015 and started a crowdfunding campaign at Indiegogo to raise funds to test the drugs against the herpesvirus and retrovirus families. In total it was predicted that $500,000 per year for 4 years would be needed to optimise and demonstrate DRACOs against clinically relevant viruses, however, two crowdfunding campaigns for $90,000 both failed to reach their target in 2016.

In 2015, an independent research group reported to have successfully observed antiviral activity against the porcine reproductive and respiratory syndrome virus (PRRSV) using DRACOs in vitro.

As of December 2015, research related to DRACOs had ground to a halt due to a lack of funding.

In July 2020, a paper from another independent research group about the effects of DRACO in vitro was published. According to the study, DRACO was nontoxic in uninfected mammalian cells, and cells infected with H1N1 influenza virus showed a "significant", dose-dependent level of apoptosis.

== Introduction ==
There are very few therapies or prophylactics for serious viruses, but for the ones that do exist, they can be divided into 3 categories:

1. Special inhibitors of a virus-associated target (e.g. HIV protease inhibitors, RNAi)
2. Vaccines, but vaccines require modification for each new virus or viral strain.
3. Interferons, but they are less virus specific and are only receptive to certain viruses.

So in order to overcome these obstacles the antiviral DRACO was developed.

== Mechanism ==
DRACO is selective for virus-infected cells. Differentiation between infected and healthy cells is made primarily via the length and type of RNA transcription helices present within the cell. Most viruses produce long dsRNA helices during transcription and replication. In contrast, uninfected mammalian cells generally produce dsRNA helices of fewer than 24 base pairs during transcription. Cell death is effected via one of the last steps in the apoptosis pathway in which complexes containing intracellular apoptosis signalling molecules simultaneously bind multiple procaspases. The procaspases transactivate via cleavage, activate additional caspases in the cascade, and cleave a variety of cellular proteins, thereby killing the cell.

It has been shown that DRACOs are nontoxic in 11 mammalian cells types and effective against 15 different viruses.
