= Antiprion drug =

Pharmaceuticals designed to combat prions

Antiprion drugs are hypothetical drugs that work against prions. The discovery of antiprion drugs is a priority because prion diseases are untreatable and fatal. Therefore, it is a therapeutic priority to find effective anti-prion drugs. In 2019, research was published describing a drug that delayed the progression of a prion disease in mice and macaques.

== Mechanism of action ==
The disease progression in prion diseases is probably due to the conformational change of the prion protein (PrP). PrP changes from alpha-helical conformation to a disease-associated, mainly beta-sheeted scrapie isoform (PrPSc), which forms amyloid aggregates. The drugs that contain N′-benzylidene-benzohydrazide core structure are likely to slow down this progression. Drugs that target PrPC, the normal prion isoform, are also hypothesized to delay the progression of prion diseases.
