= Pibrentasvir =

NS5A inhibitor antiviral agent

Clinical data
- Trade names: Mavyret, Maviret (combination with glecaprevir)
- Other names: ABT-530

Pharmacokinetic data
- Protein binding: >99.9%
- Elimination half-life: 13 hours
- Excretion: 96.6% in faeces

Identifiers
- IUPAC name: Methyl {(2S,3R)-1-[(2S)-2-{5-[(2R,5R)-1-{3,5-difluoro-4-[4-(4-fluorophenyl)-1-piperidinyl]phenyl}-5-(6-fluoro-2-{(2S)-1-[N-(methoxycarbonyl)-O-methyl-L-threonyl]-2-pyrrolidinyl}-1H-benzimidazol-5-yl)-2-pyrrolidinyl]-6-fluoro-1H-benzimidazol-2-yl}-1-pyrrolidinyl]-3-methoxy-1-oxo-2-butanyl}carbamate
- CAS Number: 1353900-92-1
- PubChem CID: 58031952
- DrugBank: DB13878
- ChemSpider: 35013016
- UNII: 2WU922TK3L
- KEGG: D10816
- CompTox Dashboard (EPA): DTXSID601027946
- ECHA InfoCard: 100.264.922

Chemical and physical data
- Formula: C_{57}H_{65}F_{5}N_{10}O_{8}
- Molar mass: 1113.201 g·mol^{−1}
- 3D model (JSmol): Interactive image
- SMILES: C[C@H]([C@@H](C(=O)N1CCC[C@H]1c2[nH]c3cc(c(cc3n2)[C@H]4CC[C@@H](N4c5cc(c(c(c5)F)N6CCC(CC6)c7ccc(cc7)F)F)c8cc9c(cc8F)[nH]c(n9)[C@@H]1CCCN1C(=O)[C@H]([C@@H](C)OC)NC(=O)OC)F)NC(=O)OC)OC
- InChI: InChI=1S/C57H65F5N10O8/c1-29(77-3)49(67-56(75)79-5)54(73)70-19-7-9-47(70)52-63-41-25-35(37(59)27-43(41)65-52)45-15-16-46(72(45)34-23-39(61)51(40(62)24-34)69-21-17-32(18-22-69)31-11-13-33(58)14-12-31)36-26-42-44(28-38(36)60)66-53(64-42)48-10-8-20-71(48)55(74)50(30(2)78-4)68-57(76)80-6/h11-14,23-30,32,45-50H,7-10,15-22H2,1-6H3,(H,63,65)(H,64,66)(H,67,75)(H,68,76)/t29-,30-,45-,46-,47+,48+,49+,50+/m1/s1; Key:VJYSBPDEJWLKKJ-NLIMODCCSA-N

Pibrentasvir is an NS5A inhibitor antiviral agent. In the United States and Europe, it is approved for use with glecaprevir as the combination drug glecaprevir/pibrentasvir (trade name Mavyret in the US and Maviret in the EU) for the treatment of hepatitis C. It is sold by Abbvie.

ibrentasvir is a pangenotypic direct-acting antiviral that targets the hepatitis C virus (HCV) NS5A protein, which plays a key role in viral RNA replication and virion assembly.. It is active against multiple HCV genotypes and has demonstrated high efficacy when used in combination with glecaprevir, contributing to sustained virologic response rates across diverse patient populations.
