= Asunaprevir =

Experimental medication

Clinical data
- Other names: BMS-650032
- ATC code: J05AP06 (WHO)

Identifiers
- IUPAC name: tert-butyl N-[(2S)-1-[(2S,4R)-4-(7-chloro-4-methoxyisoquinolin-1-yl)oxy-2-[[(1R,2S)-1-(cyclopropylsulfonylcarbamoyl)-2-ethenylcyclopropyl]carbamoyl]pyrrolidin-1-yl]-3,3-dimethyl-1-oxobutan-2-yl]carbamate
- CAS Number: 630420-16-5
- PubChem CID: 16076883
- IUPHAR/BPS: 10882
- DrugBank: DB11586
- ChemSpider: 17235944
- UNII: S9X0KRJ00S
- KEGG: D10093
- ChEBI: CHEBI:134723
- ChEMBL: ChEMBL2105735
- CompTox Dashboard (EPA): DTXSID201026065
- ECHA InfoCard: 100.206.482

Chemical and physical data
- Formula: C_{35}H_{46}ClN_{5}O_{9}S
- Molar mass: 748.29 g·mol^{−1}
- 3D model (JSmol): Interactive image
- SMILES: CC(C)(C)[C@@H](C(=O)N1C[C@@H](C[C@H]1C(=O)N[C@@]2(C[C@H]2C=C)C(=O)NS(=O)(=O)C3CC3)OC4=NC=C(C5=C4C=C(C=C5)Cl)OC)NC(=O)OC(C)(C)C
- InChI: InChI=InChI=1S/C35H46ClN5O9S/c1-9-19-16-35(19,31(44)40-51(46,47)22-11-12-22)39-28(42)25-15-21(49-29-24-14-20(36)10-13-23(24)26(48-8)17-37-29)18-41(25)30(43)27(33(2,3)4)38-32(45)50-34(5,6)7/h9-10,13-14,17,19,21-22,25,27H,1,11-12,15-16,18H2,2-8H3,(H,38,45)(H,39,42)(H,40,44)/t19-,21-,25+,27-,35-/m1/s1; Key:XRWSZZJLZRKHHD-WVWIJVSJSA-N

Asunaprevir (formerly BMS-650032, brand name in Japan and Russia Sunvepra) is an experimental drug candidate for the treatment of hepatitis C. It was undergoing development by Bristol-Myers Squibb and has completed Phase III clinical trials in 2013.

Asunaprevir is an inhibitor of the hepatitis C virus enzyme serine protease NS3. Asunaprevir is being tested in combination with pegylated interferon and ribavirin, as well as in interferon-free regimens with other direct-acting antiviral agents including daclatasvir.
