= HCV genotypes =

Hepatitis C virus (HCV) genotypes refer to the genetic variations that occurs in the hepatitis C virus. Hepatitis C is a contagious disease that primarily affects the liver, causing severe damage as the disease progresses. It is caused by the Hepatitis C virus, a small, enveloped RNA virus. The transmission of hepatitis C is through the contact with the blood of the infected person, for example by sharing the needles or by using non-sterile medical equipment. HCV is transmitted globally because of the high infection rate and is also associated with a high mortality rate. The World Health Organization indicates the 3.3% of the world population is infected by the HCV virus. Statistical records show that there are about 13 million HCV affected persons in China, 3.5 million affected persons in the United States, and about 10 million people are affected by HCV in Pakistan. In all cases, the viral genotype of the HCV stays the same, occasionally mutations do occur making the treatment more complex by targeting the changes in the genotype. Hepatitis C virus genotype is considered more common than the Hepatitis B virus infection contributing to more than a million cases annually and is considered one of the major reason for liver transplantation in United States. Some of the HCV genotypes may develop in people without symptoms leading to dangerous conditions like liver cirrhosis causing a permanent damage to liver and the unnoticed HCV conditions will affect brain, joints, blood vessels, bones, and kidneys.

The complexity of the HCV genotypes made the treatment specific for the associated genotype. The treatment for the HCV genotype also depends on the presence or absence of cirrhosis. There are six major genotypes of hepatitis C virus which includes many subtypes. The genotype can affect treatment of HCV infections. Recent studies show that HCV genotypes consist of 8 genotypes and 67 subtypes. All the genotypes and subtypes affect the liver to the same extent of damage irrespective of the HCV genotype Among the common six genotypes, genotype 1 is the most prevalent form in the United States of America, covering around 70-90% of total infections. It is usually difficult to treat the people with HCV genotype 1. Genotype 2 and genotype 3 are less common contributing to around 10-20%. Genotypes 4 and 5 affect a large proportion of the population in undeveloped countries. Genotype 4 is the most common type of infections in Middle East and Africa, around 80% of total infections. About 15% of the people affected by HCV genotypes will get cured without medications, in which immune system plays a vital role in defeating the virus. Until recently, there were no specific vaccines available for treating hepatitis C virus genotypes.

== Geographical distribution ==
People traveling around different subcontinents where several HCV genotypes are common will have the possibility of resulting in mixed infection.

Geographical distribution of HCV subtypes
HCV genotypes	Subsets	Geographical distribution
Genotype 1	1a, 1b	North America, Central Africa, Europe
Genotype 2	2a, 2b, 2c, 2d	Western Africa
Genotype 3	3a, 3b, 3c, 3d, 3e, 3f	Southeast Asia
Genotype 4	4a, 4b, 4c, 4d, 4e, 4f, 4g, 4h, 4i, 4j	Central Africa
Genotype 5	5a	South Africa and Asia
Genotype 6	6a	Southeast Asia

== Techniques ==
The Main techniques used to diagnose the HCV genotype are as follows:

- HCV ELISA (Enzyme-linked immunosorbent assay)
- Quantitative HCV-RNA PCR (Hepatitis C virus-Ribonucleic acid Polymerase Chain reaction)
- Recombinant immunoblot assay
