= Hepatitis C virus nonstructural protein 4A =

Viral protein

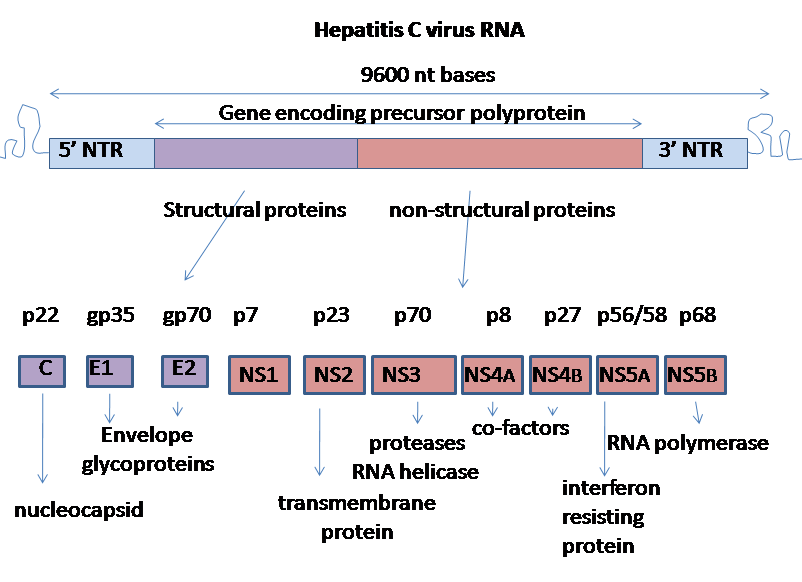
- HCV genome

Identifiers
- Organism: Hepacivirus hominis
- Symbol: NS4A
- Entrez: 951475
- RefSeq (Prot): NP_751925.1
- UniProt: F0UY39

Other data
- Chromosome: Genomic: 0.01 - 0.01 Mb
Search for
- Structures: Swiss-model
- Domains: InterPro

Nonstructural protein 4A (NS4A) is a viral protein found in the hepatitis C virus. It acts as a cofactor for the enzyme NS3.
