= Hepatitis C virus nonstructural protein 3 =

Protein family

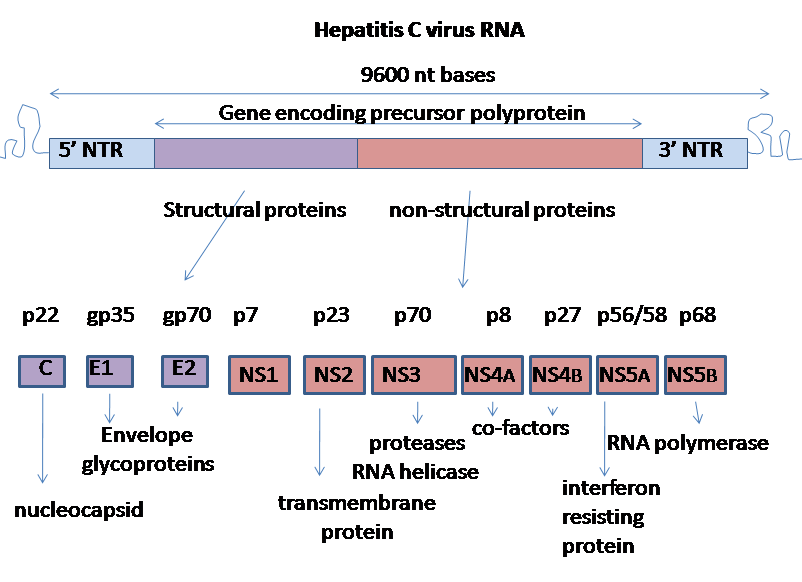
- HCV genome

Identifiers
- Organism: Hepacivirus hominis
- Symbol: NS3
- Entrez: 951475
- Orthologs: NCBI: entry; OMA: entry
- RefSeq (Prot): NP_803144.1
- UniProt: Q91RS4

Other data
- Chromosome: Genomic: 0 - 0 Mb
Search for
- Structures: Swiss-model
- Domains: InterPro

Nonstructural protein 3 (NS3), also known as p-70, is a viral nonstructural protein that is the 70 kDa cleavage product of the hepatitis C virus polyprotein. It acts as a serine protease. The C-terminal two-thirds of the protein also acts as a helicase and nucleoside triphosphatase. The first (N-terminal) 180 amino acids of NS3 have an additional role as cofactor domains for the NS2 protein.

== See also ==
- Boceprevir, sovaprevir, paritaprevir and telaprevir - drugs targeting this protein
