= William Anthony Farone =

Scientist and tobacco industry whistleblower

William Anthony Farone was Director of Applied Research at Philip Morris from 1976 to 1984. He was hired at Philip Morris to make safer products and to find business alternatives outside the tobacco industry.

William Farone was fired from Philip Morris and he is considered in lawsuits to be an anti-tobacco expert.

== Background ==
Farone has a PhD in Physical Chemistry (1965), an MS in Chemistry (1962) and was awarded his BS in Chemistry with honors in 1961. All of his degrees are from Clarkson University in Potsdam, New York. Dr. Farone carried double majors during his undergraduate years and also has a strong background in business, mathematics, organic chemistry and engineering.

Farone spent eight years as a top scientist at Philip Morris, and was tasked with creating a safer cigarette that would provide smokers with the desired pharmaceutical effects of nicotine but with less risk to health. Farone was later fired from the company. Farone has given government officials and trial lawyers valuable information on industry practices from the upper reaches of Philip Morris' internal company research.

== Testimony ==
Farone claimed in his testimony in the Donald A. LaBelle case in July, 2000 that it is possible to make safer cigarettes, and that the means for doing so were known to the industry. He indicated that the only way to know if you've made a safer cigarette is to test it for biological toxicity, and failure to do so means that you haven't shown that it's safer. He contended that as early as 1936 it was possible to make cigarettes safer than those that were being marketed to the public at that time. He maintained that the industry deliberately manipulated the levels of nicotine by changing the ratios of nicotine and tar in their products. The witness noted that Philip Morris continually denied causation and addiction of nicotine, but that both of those concepts were accepted when he was working as a Philip Morris scientist. He argued that some of Philip Morris' statements about the relationship between smoking and disease were unethical. He suggested that Philip Morris purposefully kept the smoking/health controversy alive.

According to Farone who has a Ph.D. in Physical Chemistry, an M.S. in Chemistry, and worked for Phillip Morris from 1976 to 1984 as Director of Applied Research, the company Chrysalis Technologies who is a subsidiary of the Altria Group, a company that is now operating as a division of Philip Morris, has developed a soft mist aerosol technology for pulmonary drug delivery that could be used as a nicotine inhaler and could put an end to cigarette smoking, he stated in the documentary The Tobacco Conspiracy, that this just won't happen because the cigarette companies that developed it would lose all of their profits.

Dr. Farone has continued to work in the same field, this time formulating and developing innovative products for tobacco users. Mainly his formula for a nicotine and tar and chemical residue eliminating mouthwash brand-named Nicorinse and trademarked in The United States, Europe, China, and Canada. He continues to work and consult on innovations in oral health.

== Bibliography ==
- Malka, Sophie; Gregori, Marco (2005). Infiltration : une taupe à la solde de Philip Morris (in French). Georg éditeur. ISBN 9782825709146. Foreword by William Anthony Farone.
