= Ribavirin =

Antiviral medication

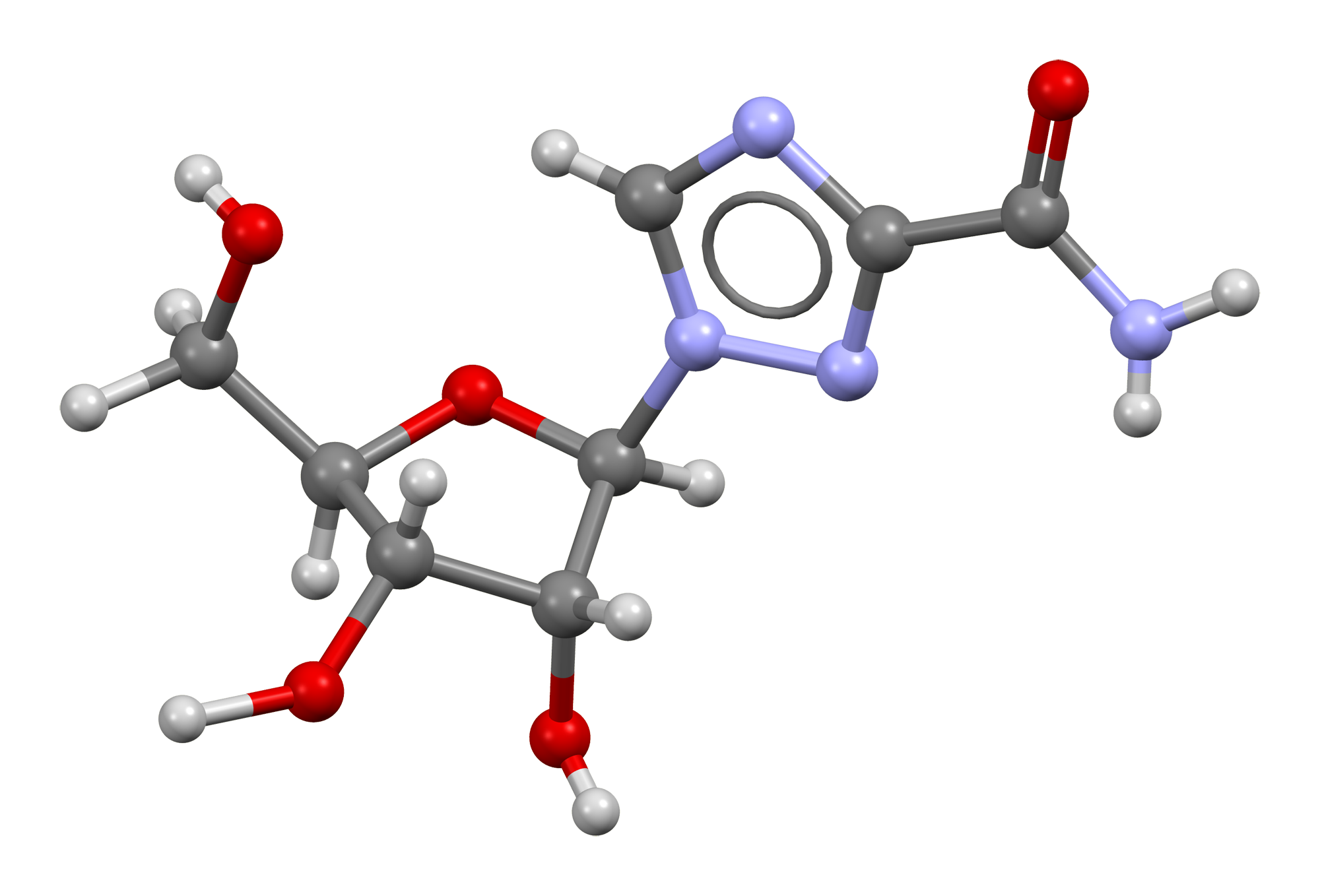

Clinical data
- Pronunciation: /ˌraɪbəˈvaɪrɪn/ RY-bə-VY-rin
- Trade names: Copegus, Rebetol, Virazole, other
- Other names: 1-(β-D-Ribofuranosyl)-1"H"-1,2,4-triazole-3-carboxamide, tribavirin (BAN UK)
- AHFS/Drugs.com: Monograph
- MedlinePlus: a605018
- License data: EU EMA: by INN; US DailyMed: Ribavirin
- Pregnancy category: AU: X (High risk)
- Routes of administration: Oral, Inhalation
- ATC code: J05AP01 (WHO)

Legal status
- Legal status: AU: S4 (Prescription only); BR: Class C1 (Other controlled substances); CA: ℞-only; UK: POM (Prescription only); US: ℞-only; EU: Rx-only

Pharmacokinetic data
- Bioavailability: 64%
- Protein binding: 0%
- Metabolism: liver and intracellularly
- Elimination half-life: 298 hours (multiple dose); 43.6 hours (single dose)
- Excretion: Urine (61%), faeces (12%)

Identifiers
- IUPAC name: 1-[(2R,3R,4S,5R)-3,4-Dihydroxy-5-(hydroxymethyl)oxolan-2-yl]-1H-1,2,4-triazole-3-carboxamide
- CAS Number: 36791-04-5
- PubChem CID: 37542
- IUPHAR/BPS: 6842
- DrugBank: DB00811
- ChemSpider: 34439
- UNII: 49717AWG6K
- KEGG: D00423
- ChEMBL: ChEMBL1643
- NIAID ChemDB: 000053
- PDB ligand: RBV (PDBe, RCSB PDB)
- CompTox Dashboard (EPA): DTXSID8023557
- ECHA InfoCard: 100.164.587

Chemical and physical data
- Formula: C_{8}H_{12}N_{4}O_{5}
- Molar mass: 244.207 g·mol^{−1}
- 3D model (JSmol): Interactive image
- Melting point: 166 to 168 °C (331 to 334 °F)
- SMILES: OC[C@@H](O1)[C@@H](O)[C@@H](O)[C@@H]1N2N=C(C(N)=O)N=C2
- InChI: InChI=1S/C8H12N4O5/c9-6(16)7-10-2-12(11-7)8-5(15)4(14)3(1-13)17-8/h2-5,8,13-15H,1H2,(H2,9,16)/t3-,4-,5-,8-/m1/s1; Key:IWUCXVSUMQZMFG-AFCXAGJDSA-N

Ribavirin, also known as tribavirin, is an antiviral medication used to treat illness caused by respiratory syncytial virus (RSV) and hepatitis C virus (HCV) infections, as well as some viral hemorrhagic fevers. For HCV, it is used in combination with other medications, such as simeprevir, sofosbuvir, peginterferon alfa-2b or peginterferon alfa-2a. It can also be used for viral hemorrhagic fevers—specifically, for Lassa fever, Crimean–Congo hemorrhagic fever, and hantavirus infections (with exceptions for Ebola or Marburg virus diseases). Ribavirin is usually taken orally (by mouth) or inhaled. Despite widespread usage, it has faced scrutiny in the 21st century because of lack of proven efficacy in treating viral infections for which it has been prescribed in the past.

Its common side effects include fatigue, headache, nausea, fever, muscle pains, and an irritable mood. Serious side effects include red blood cell breakdown, liver problems, and allergic reactions. Its use during pregnancy can bring harm to the developing fetus. Effective birth control is recommended for both males and females for at least seven months during and after use. The mechanism of action of ribavirin is not entirely clear.

Ribavirin was patented in 1971 and approved for medical use in 1986. It is on the World Health Organization's List of Essential Medicines. It is available as a generic medication.

== Medical uses ==
Ribavirin is primarily used to treat chronic hepatitis C and viral hemorrhagic fevers (an orphan indication in most countries). Its efficacy for these purposes has been questioned in light of its Food and Drug Administration boxed warning against its use as monotherapy for chronic hepatitis C. Thus, it may be prescribed in the United States only as an adjunct to one or more other medications. Its efficacy against viruses other than HCV, including those that cause viral hemorrhagic fever, has not been conclusively demonstrated. In effect, it is not approved in the United States for treatment of viruses other than HCV.

=== Hepatitis c ===
For chronic HCV infection, the oral (capsule or tablet) form of ribavirin is used only in combination with pegylated interferon alfa. Statins may improve this combination's efficacy in treating hepatitis C. When possible, genotyping of the specific viral strain is done; and ribavirin is only used as a dose-escalating (Note: Begins with a low dose, at or near the lowest point of the expected therapeutic index, and then the dose is progressively increased until achieving desired effects.) adjuvant to specific combinations of genotypes and other medications.

Acute hepatitis C infection (within the first 6 months) often does not require immediate treatment, as many infections eventually resolve without treatment. When the decision is made to treat acute hepatitis C, ribavirin may be used as an adjunct to several drug combinations. However, other medications are still preferred.

=== Viral hemorrhagic fever ===
Ribavirin is the only known treatment for a variety of viral hemorrhagic fevers, including Lassa fever, Crimean-Congo hemorrhagic fever, Venezuelan hemorrhagic fever, and hantavirus infection, although data regarding these infections are scarce and the drug might be effective only in early stages. It is noted by the United States Army Medical Research Institute of Infectious Diseases (USAMRIID) that "Ribavirin has poor in vitro and in vivo activity against the filoviruses (Ebola and Marburg) and the flaviviruses (dengue, yellow fever, Omsk hemorrhagic fever, and Kyasanur forest disease)" The aerosol form has been used in the past to treat respiratory syncytial virus-related diseases in children, although the evidence to support this is rather weak.

Despite questions surrounding its efficacy, ribavirin remains the only antiviral known to be effective in treating Lassa fever.

It has been used (in combination with ketamine, midazolam, and amantadine) in treatment of rabies.

=== Experimental uses ===
Experimental data indicate that ribavirin may have useful activity against canine distemper and poxviruses. Ribavirin has also been used as a treatment for herpes simplex virus. One small study found that ribavirin treatment reduced the severity of herpes outbreaks and promoted recovery, as compared with placebo treatment. Another study found that ribavirin potentiated the antiviral effect of acyclovir.

Some interest has been seen in its possible use as a treatment for cancers with elevated eukaryotic translation initiation factor eIF4E, especially acute myeloid leukemia (AML) as well as in head and neck cancers. Ribavirin targeted eIF4E in AML patients in monotherapy and combination studies and this corresponded to objective clinical responses including complete remissions. Ribavirin resistance in AML patients arose leading to loss of eIF4E targeting and relapse. Resistance was caused by deactivation of ribavirin through its glucuronidation in AML cells or impaired drug entry/retention in the AML cells. There may be additional forms of ribavirin resistance displayed by cancer cells. In HPV related oropharyngeal cancers, ribavirin reduced levels of phosphorylated form of eIF4E in some patients. The best response here was stable disease but another head and neck study had more promising results.

== Adverse effects ==
The medication has two FDA "black box" warnings: One raises concerns that use before or during pregnancy by either sex may result in birth defects in the baby, and the other is regarding the risk of red blood cell breakdown.

Ribavirin should not be given with zidovudine because of the increased risk of anemia; concurrent use with didanosine should likewise be avoided because of an increased risk of mitochondrial toxicity.

== Mechanisms of action ==
It is a guanosine (ribonucleic) analog used to stop viral RNA synthesis and viral mRNA capping, thus, it is a nucleoside analog. Ribavirin is a prodrug, which when metabolized resembles purine RNA nucleotides. In this form, it interferes with RNA metabolism required for viral replication. Over five direct and indirect mechanisms have been proposed for its mechanism of action. The enzyme inosine triphosphate pyrophosphatase (ITPase) dephosphorylates ribavirin triphosphate in vitro to ribavirin monophosphate, and ITPase reduced enzymatic activity present in 30% of humans potentiates mutagenesis in hepatitis C virus.

=== RNA viruses ===
Ribavirin's amide group can make the native nucleoside drug resemble adenosine or guanosine, depending on its rotation. For this reason, when ribavirin is incorporated into RNA, as a base analog of either adenine or guanine, it pairs equally well with either uracil or cytosine, inducing mutations in RNA-dependent replication in RNA viruses. Such hypermutation can be lethal to RNA viruses.

=== DNA viruses ===
Neither of these mechanisms explains ribavirin's effect on many DNA viruses, currently the mechanism is not fully known, especially given the complete inactivity of ribavirin's 2' deoxyribose analogue, which suggests that the drug functions only as an RNA nucleoside mimic, and never a DNA nucleoside mimic. Ribavirin 5'-monophosphate inhibits cellular inosine monophosphate dehydrogenase, thereby depleting intracellular pools of GTP.

== eIF4E targeting in cancer ==
The eukaryotic translation initiation factor eIF4E plays multiple roles in RNA metabolism with translation being the best described (reviewed in). Biophysical and NMR studies first revealed that ribavirin directly bound the eIF4E, providing another mechanism for its action. ^{3}H Ribavirin also interacts with eIF4E in cells. While inosine monophosphate dehydrogenase (IMPDH) presumably only binds the ribavirin monophosphate metabolite (RMP), eIF4E can bind ribavirin and with higher affinity ribavirin's phosphorylated forms. In many cell lines, studies into steady state levels of metabolites indicate that ribavirin triphosphate (RTP) is more abundant than the RMP metabolite which is the IMPDH ligand. RTP binds to eIF4E in its cap-binding site as observed by NMR. Ribavirin inhibits eIF4E activities in cells including in its RNA export, translation and oncogenic activities. Indeed, eIF4E overexpression rescues cells from the effects of ribavirin treatment. (reviewed in). In AML patients treated with ribavirin, ribavirin blocked the nuclear import of eIF4E through interfering with its interaction with its nuclear importer, Importin 8, thereby impairing its nuclear activities. Clinical relapse in AML patients and cell lines corresponded to loss of ribavirin binding leading to nuclear re-entry of eIF4E and re-emergence of its nuclear activities. In all, over 30 studies over a wide array of cancer cell lines and animal models have shown that ribavirin can target eIF4E with objective clinical responses seen in some patients in early phase clinical trials (reviewed in).

== History and culture ==
Ribavirin was first made in 1972 under the National Cancer Institute's Virus-Cancer program. This was done by researchers from International Chemical and Nuclear Corporation including Roberts A. Smith, Joseph T. Witkovski and Roland K. Robins. It was reported that ribavirin was active against a variety of RNA and DNA viruses in culture and in animals, without undue toxicity in the context of cancer chemotherapies. By the late 1970s, the Virus-Cancer program was widely considered a failure, and the drug development was abandoned.

After the US Government announced that AIDS was caused by a retrovirus in 1984, drugs examined during the Virus-Cancer program and its focus on retroviruses were re-examined. Although the FDA first approved ribavirin as an antiviral in 1986, it was not indicated to treat HIV or AIDS. As a result, many people with AIDS sought to obtain black market ribavirin via buyer's clubs. The drug was approved for investigational use against hantavirus in the United States in 1993, but the results from a non-randomized uncontrolled trial were not encouraging: 71% of recipients became anemic and 47% died.

In 2002 with the SARS outbreak, early speculation focused on ribavirin as a possible anti-SARS agent. Early protocols adopted in Hong Kong adopted a "Hit Hard Hit Early" approach treating SARS with high doses of off-label steroids and Ribavirin. Unfortunately, it later turned out this haphazard approach was at best ineffective and at worst fatal, with many deaths attributed to SARS caused by ribavirin toxicity.

=== Names ===
Ribavirin is the INN and USAN, whereas tribavirin is the BAN. Brand names of generic forms include Copegus, Ribasphere, Rebetol.

== Derivatives ==
Ribavirin is possibly best viewed as a ribosyl purine analogue with an incomplete purine 6-membered ring. This structural resemblance historically prompted replacement of the 2' nitrogen of the triazole with a carbon (which becomes the 5' carbon in an imidazole), in an attempt to partly "fill out" the second ring--- but to no great effect. Such 5' imidazole riboside derivatives show antiviral activity with 5' hydrogen or halide, but the larger the substituent, the smaller the activity, and all proved less active than ribavirin. Note that two natural products were already known with this imidazole riboside structure: substitution at the 5' carbon with OH results in pyrazofurin, an antibiotic with antiviral properties but unacceptable toxicity, and replacement with an amino group results in the natural purine synthetic precursor 5-aminoimidazole-4-carboxamide-1-β-D-ribofuranoside (AICAR), which has only modest antiviral properties.

=== Taribavirin ===
The most successful ribavirin derivative to date is the 3-carboxamidine derivative of the parent 3-carboxamide, first reported in 1973 by J. T. Witkowski et al., and now called taribavirin (former names "viramidine" and "ribamidine"). This drug shows a similar spectrum of antiviral activity to ribavirin, which is not surprising as it is now known to be a pro-drug for ribavirin. Taribavirin, however, has useful properties of less erythrocyte-trapping and better liver-targeting than ribavirin. The first property is due to taribavirin's basic amidine group which inhibits drug entry into RBCs, and the second property is probably due to increased concentration of the enzymes which convert amidine to amide in liver tissue. Taribavirin completed phase III human trials in 2012.
