= Taribavirin =

Antiviral drug

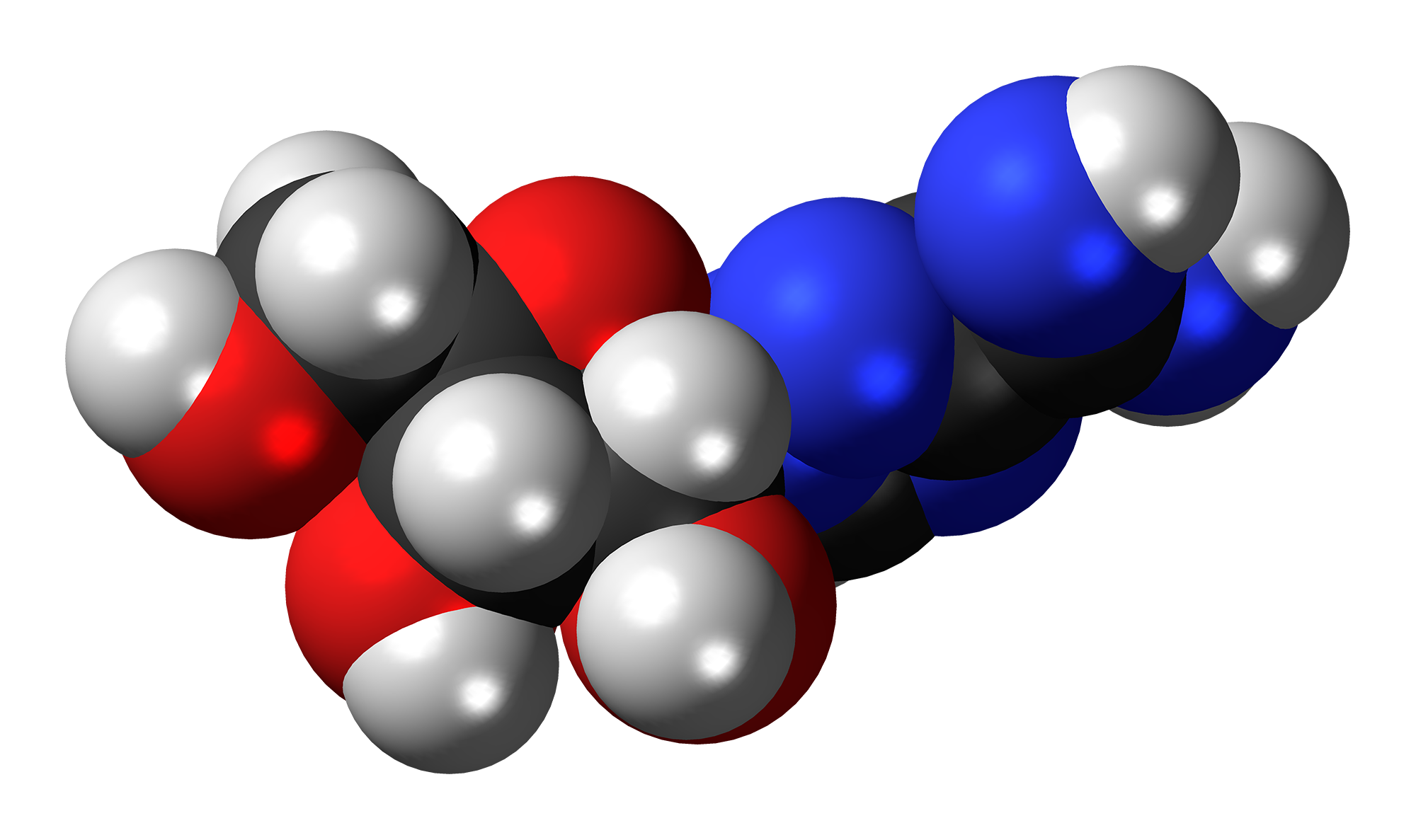

Clinical data
- Other names: 1-(β-D-Ribofuranosyl)- 1,2,4-triazole-3-carboximide
- Pregnancy category: X
- Routes of administration: Oral capsules)
- ATC code: J05AB04 (WHO)

Legal status
- Legal status: In Phase III drug trials

Pharmacokinetic data
- Bioavailability: 9%
- Metabolism: Metabolized to 5'phosphates, de-riboside, and deriboside carboxylic acid
- Elimination half-life: 12 days - Multiple Dose; 120-170 hours - Single Dose
- Excretion: 10% fecal, remainder in urine (30% unchanged, remainder metabolites)

Identifiers
- IUPAC name: 1-[(2R,3R,4S,5R)- 3,4-dihydroxy-5- (hydroxymethyl)oxolan-2-yl]- 1,2,4-triazole-3-carboximidamide
- CAS Number: 119567-79-2
- PubChem CID: 451448
- DrugBank: none
- ChemSpider: 397669
- UNII: R3B1994K2E
- KEGG: D06651
- NIAID ChemDB: 000198
- CompTox Dashboard (EPA): DTXSID80894181

Chemical and physical data
- Formula: C_{8}H_{13}N_{5}O_{4}
- Molar mass: 243.223 g·mol^{−1}
- 3D model (JSmol): Interactive image
- SMILES: n1c(nn(c1)[C@@H]2O[C@@H]([C@@H](O)[C@H]2O)CO)C(=[N@H])N
- InChI: InChI=1S/C8H13N5O4/c9-6(10)7-11-2-13(12-7)8-5(16)4(15)3(1-14)17-8/h2-5,8,14-16H,1H2,(H3,9,10)/t3-,4-,5-,8-/m1/s1; Key:NHKZSTHOYNWEEZ-AFCXAGJDSA-N

Taribavirin (rINN; also known as viramidine, codenamed ICN 3142) is an antiviral drug in Phase III human trials, but not yet approved for pharmaceutical use. It is a prodrug of ribavirin, active against a number of DNA and RNA viruses. Taribavirin has better liver-targeting than ribavirin, and has a shorter life in the body due to less penetration and storage in red blood cells. It is expected eventually to be the drug of choice for viral hepatitis syndromes in which ribavirin is active. These include hepatitis C and perhaps also hepatitis B and yellow fever.

== Uses ==
Taribavirin is as active against influenza as ribavirin in animal models, with slightly less toxicity, so it may also eventually replace ribavirin as an anti-influenza agent.

== History ==
Taribavirin was first reported in 1973 by J. T. Witkowski et al., then working at ICN Pharmaceuticals, in an attempt to find a more active derivative of ribavirin. Taribavirin is being developed by Valeant Pharmaceuticals International. Valeant is testing the drug as a treatment for chronic hepatitis C.

== Pharmacology ==
Note on formulas: The carboxamidine group of this molecule is somewhat basic, and therefore this drug is also known and administered as the hydrochloride salt (with a corresponding HCl chemical formula and different ChemID / PubChem number). At physiologic pH, the positive charge on the molecule from partial protonation of the carboximide group contributes to the relative slowness with which the drug crosses cell membranes (such as in red blood cells) until it has been metabolized into ribavirin. In the liver, however, the transformation from carboxamidine to carboxamide happens on first-pass metabolism and contributes to the higher levels of ribavirin found in liver cells and bile when viramidine is administered.
