= Nicorinse =

Brand of mouthwash formulated to help users quit smoking

Nicorinse is a brand of mouthwash formulated to help users quit smoking cigarettes. It was invented by Dr. William Farone. Nicorinse is formulated to reduce the presence and residue of tobacco chemicals in the mouth, including nicotine. Nicorinse was originally launched in North America, then in the United Kingdom in February 2015. Compared to other smoking prevention products, it is notable for not containing nicotine. The Nicorinse name is registered as a European Union trademark of John W. Nesbitt Inc. since 26 December 2008.
