= INNA-051 =

Investigational nasal innate immune modulator

Clinical data
- Routes of administration: Intranasal
- Drug class: Toll-like receptor 2/6 agonist

Legal status
- Legal status: Investigational

Pharmacokinetic data
- Bioavailability: Limited systemic exposure after nasal dosing

INNA-051 is a small molecule antiviral prophylactic candidate developed by Ena Respiratory for minimizing symptoms associated with viral respiratory infections. It is an investigational small-molecule Toll-like receptor 2/6 (TLR2 / TLR6) agonist administered as a nasal spray. ENA Respiratory, a clinical-stage company in Melbourne, is developing it as a seasonal prophylactic to reduce illness from common respiratory viruses rather than as a conventional vaccine.

The compound is a synthetic analogue of the bacterial lipopeptide Pam2Cys. After nasal delivery it binds TLR2/6 on airway lining cells and local immune cells. That signal is intended to prime the innate immune system at the typical entry site of influenza, rhinovirus, respiratory syncytial virus (RSV), and coronaviruses.

Early human studies reported engagement of host-defense pathways and an acceptable short-term safety profile. A controlled Influenza challenge study reported a shorter detectable infection period in a post-hoc analysis of participants with little pre-existing antibody to the challenge strain. A larger US community trial is testing weekly dry-powder dosing during respiratory-virus season.

Developers position INNA-051 for people at higher risk of complications, including older adults, people with chronic lung, heart, kidney, or metabolic disease, and workers with frequent close contact. As of 2026 it has no marketing approval. It does not train virus-specific adaptive immunity the way a vaccine does.

== Mechanism ==
Toll-like receptors detect conserved microbial patterns and start innate immune signalling. TLR2 pairs with TLR6 to recognise diacylated lipopeptides. INNA-051 is engineered as a stable agonist of that heterodimer, with limited movement from the nose into the bloodstream.

Nasal dosing in healthy adults raised local chemokines such as MCP-1 and MIP-1α within hours. Gene-expression analyses reported activation of TLR, inflammasome, and antiviral response pathways, plus inferred recruitment of innate immune cells into nasal epithelium. Plasma concentrations stayed below the assay limit in the first-in-human study.

Company and review papers describe a response lasting long enough to support once-weekly use and an onset measured in less than 24 hours. They also describe the approach as pathogen-agnostic, meaning activity does not depend on matching a single viral surface protein. That claim rests on animal work against several viruses and on human pharmacology, not on licensed efficacy against each virus in the community.

A single-dose dry powder uses Aptar’s Unidose powder nasal system, intended for self-administration.

== History ==
The TLR2/6 agonist chemistry was identified in 2012. The first intended use was as a vaccine adjuvant.

Innavac Pty Ltd in 2016 developed the platform. The firm later became ENA Therapeutics and in 2020, independent company ENA Respiratory Pty Ltd.

Public interest rose during the COVID-19 pandemic after a ferret study of prophylactic INNA-051 against SARS-CoV-2 appeared in January 2021. The first human safety study launched in July 2021.

ENA announced plans in September 2021 for a human influenza challenge study with hVIVO and for a COVID-19 post-exposure programme. The influenza challenge (NCT05255822) enrolled 123 adults. Headline results were released in 2023. Peer-reviewed reports of human and challenge studies appeared in December 2024.

The United States Food and Drug Administration cleared an investigational drug application in April 2024. A US allowance for a key patent followed in May 2024. An invited review of discovery and development appeared in 2025.

Flu Lab invested US$5 million in February 2025. A Series B round of US$22.4 million closed in October 2025, Uniseed, Stoic Venture Capital, the Gates Foundation, and Flu Lab among backers. The company reported a USD13.1 million United States Department of Defense contract and an AU$950,000 CUREator grant in 2024.

The POSITS Phase 2a community study (NCT07222670) began dosing on 4 December 2025. Part A treated 200 adults at five US sites for four weeks. A safety review in May 2026 found no concerns. Part B dosing of up to 900 participants for 12 weeks began in September 2026.

On 1 September 2026 ENA received AU$2.98 million from Biointelect Venturer for a planned Phase 1b trial in adults with asthma, expected to start in the first quarter of 2027.

== Research ==
=== Preclinical studies ===
In a SARS-CoV-2 ferret model, prophylactic nasal INNA-051 reduced viral RNA five days after exposure by up to 96% in throat swabs and 93% in nasal wash compared with untreated animals.

Review papers reported prophylaxis against influenza and rhinovirus in animals, with upregulation of NF-κB-linked antimicrobial genes, type III interferons, and immune-cell recruitment. Those studies support weekly dosing in later human protocols. They do not establish prevention of severe human disease.

=== Clinical studies ===
The first-in-human trial randomised 64 adults aged 19–55 years to single doses of 20–600 µg or repeated doses of 60–300 µg. Investigators reported no dose-limiting toxicities. Adverse events were mostly mild nasal congestion and runny nose.

The influenza challenge study randomised 123 adults aged 19–53 years to placebo, 150 µg, or 300 µg given two times before exposure to influenza A/Perth/16/2009 (H3N2). Laboratory-confirmed infection rates were 45% with placebo, 53% with 150 µg, and 59% with 300 µg. The study did not report prevention of infection. In a post-hoc group with confirmed infection and little antibody to the challenge virus, mean duration of detectable viral RNA was 106.1 hours after 300 µg and 132.1 hours after placebo, a difference of about 26 hours (adjusted p = 0.017). Authors noted lower-than-planned infection rates and residual immunity in some volunteers as limits on interpretation.

A later paper examined host-defence markers in older adults and influenza protection in aged mice. POSITS is a two-part, double-blind, placebo-controlled Phase 2a study in about 1,100 healthy adults aged 18–45 years with high exposure risk, such as crowded housing, barracks, childcare, or similar circumstances. Primary endpoints include safety and, in Part B, PCR-confirmed symptomatic infection and symptom burden. Estimated primary completion is March 2027.

== Safety ==
Across completed Phase 1 and influenza-challenge dosing, INNA-051 was described as well tolerated, with no serious treatment-related events identified in published reports. Local nasal symptoms were more common than with placebo in the challenge study (80.5% versus 49%). Part A of POSITS completed four weeks of weekly dry-powder dosing in 200 participants without a safety signal that stopped the trial.

Longer seasonal use, use in older adults with multimorbidity, and use in asthma or COPD remain under study. POSITS excludes asthma and several chronic illnesses. A separate asthma safety study is planned.

== See also ==
- Innate immune system
- Toll-like receptor
- Nasal administration Influenza
- Respiratory syncytial virus
