= AptarGroup =

Pharmaceutical Packaging Firm

AptarGroup, Inc.
- Trade name: Aptar
- Type: Public
- Traded as: NYSE: ATR; S&P 400 component
- Industry: Packaging and drug delivery devices
- Founded: 1992; 34 years ago
- Headquarters: Crystal Lake, Illinois, U.S.
- Key people: Gael Touya (CEO), Vanessa Kanu (CFO), Shiela Vinczeller (CHRO)
- Products: Spray pumps and valves; Metered-dose inhaler valves; Nasal spray systems; Dispensing closures; Elastomer components for injection devices; Active packaging
- Revenue: ▲US$3.78 billion (2025)
- Net income: ▲US$393 million (2025) (2025)
- Number of employees: 13,800 (2023)
- Subsidiaries: Next Breath; Cohero Health; Gateway Analytical; SeaquistPerfect Dispensing; Seaquist Closures; CSP Technologies; Noble International; FusionPKG; Voluntis; WeiHai Hengyu Medical Products Co., Ltd.; Nanopharm; Aptar Digital Health
- Website: www.aptar.com

AptarGroup, Inc., also known as Aptar, is a United States–based global manufacturer of consumer dispensing packaging and drug delivery devices. The group has manufacturing operations in 18 countries.

== History ==
The company began as Werner Die & Stamping in Cary, Illinois, in 1946 and later incorporated as AptarGroup in 1992. Aptar originally developed spray valves and pumps for consumer and household products. The company later began producing nasal administration and pulmonary drug delivery devices such as nasal spray systems and metered-dose inhaler valves. Biotech and pharmaceutical companies use Aptar's different Unidose and Bidose devices for the single or two-shot intranasal delivery of different medicines.

In 2016, Aptar announced that it provided the delivery system for Adapt Pharma's Narcan. Narcan is a naloxone hydrochloride nasal spray used as an emergency treatment for opioid overdoses. Aptar's liquid spray drug delivery technology platform works as a ready-to-use, single-shot, unit-dose system for Narcan. It was the first FDA approved nasally administered, ready-to-use medication used to reverse the effects of an opioid overdose. Narcan does not require any assembly, medical training, or needle injection.

In 2016, Aptar entered into an agreement with Becton Dickinson & Company to develop new self-injection devices.

Aptar entered into an agreement in 2016 with Propeller Health Partners to develop a digitally connected medication inhaler. The company made an investment in Propeller Health Partners (now part of Resmed) in 2018.

In July 2019, the FDA-approved Aptar Pharma's Unidose Powder System as the first intranasally-delivered, needle-free rescue treatment for severe hypoglycemia.

In 2020, during the COVID-19 pandemic, Aptar invested in new tools to accelerate its molding equipment and assembly machines for pumps, but it still wasn't enough to keep up with demand.

=== Acquisitions ===
In 2012, Aptar acquired Stelmi, a manufacturer of elastomer primary packaging components. In 2016, Aptar acquired Mega Airless, a manufacturer of airless packaging. In 2018, Aptar acquired CSP Technologies, a material science company that manufactures active packaging.

In June 2019, Aptar acquired two companies, Nanopharm and Gateway Analytical. In November 2019, the company acquired Noble International, which specializes in training devices and patient onboarding. In February 2020, Aptar acquired FusionPKG, a makeup packaging company.

In November 2020, the company acquired the digital respiratory health company Cohero Health.

In July 2021 Aptar acquired the digital therapeutics company, Voluntis (ENXTPA: ALVTX), and 80% of the equity interests of Weihai Hengyu Medical Products Co., Ltd., a Chinese manufacturer of elastomeric and plastic components used in injectable drug delivery.

== Sustainability ==
Aptar was named to Barron's list of the Top 100 Most Sustainable U.S. Companies in 2019, 2020, 2021, and 2022. At the end of 2020, 85% of the company’s global electricity use came from renewable sources. It was also named by Newsweek as one of America's Most Responsible Companies in 2021, 2022, and 2023 and received an A score for climate change from the Climate Disclosure Project.

In September 2019, the company announced a partnership with Loop, a shopping platform from TerraCycle that delivers products in reusable containers. The company made the Forbes Green Growth 50 List in 2021.
