= IVX-411 =

COVID-19 nanoparticle vaccine candidate

IX-411
Vaccine description
- Target: SARS-CoV-2
- Vaccine type: Virus-like particles

Clinical data
- Routes of administration: Intramuscular

IVX-411 is a COVID-19 candidate nanoparticle vaccine under development by Icosavax currently undergoing a Phase I/II clinical trial in Australia. It was originally developed at the Institute of Protein Design (IPD) and the University of Washington School of Medicine, both based at the University of Washington.

In 2022 results were released that the RDB antigen component of the vaccine was unstable, which resulted in reduced potency.
