= Pulmonary drug delivery =

Route of administration by inhalation

Illustration of the respiratory system

Pulmonary drug delivery is a route of administration in which patients use an inhaler to inhale their medications and drugs are absorbed into the bloodstream via the lung mucous membrane. This technique is most commonly used in the treatment of lung diseases, for example, asthma and chronic obstructive pulmonary disease (COPD). Different types of inhalers include metered-dose inhalers (MDI), dry powder inhalers (DPI), soft mist inhalers (SMI) and nebulizers. The rate and efficacy of pulmonary drug delivery are affected by drug particle properties, breathing patterns and respiratory tract geometry.

Pulmonary drug delivery minimizes systemic side effects and increases bioavailability owing to the localised absorption through the lung. The disadvantages include possible drug irritation to the lung, limited drug dissolution, relatively high drug clearance, and the drug effectiveness depends on the inhaler techniques and patients' compliance. Drug formulation can be challenging since the drug has to bypass the defence mechanisms in the respiratory tract. Pharmacokinetics and pharmacodynamics of the drug in elderly patients can also be particularly difficult to predict due to age-related changes in body composition.

Ongoing developments in inhaler device engineering, technology and drug formulations may improve the efficacy and overcome the challenges of pulmonary drug delivery. Recent advancements involve the utilization of the pulmonary route as an entry to systemic circulation for treating different diseases, as well as the development of pulmonary drug formulation and particle engineering technology to increase the efficacy of pulmonary delivery.

== Application / Clinical use ==
Pulmonary drug delivery is mainly utilized for topical applications in the lungs, such as the use of inhaled beta-agonists, corticosteroids and anticholinergic agents for the treatment of asthma and COPD, the use of inhaled mucolytics and antibiotics for the treatment of cystic fibrosis (CT) and respiratory viral infections, and the use of inhaled prostacyclin analogs for the treatment of pulmonary arterial hypertension (PAH).

In addition, this technique is employed for systemic application, for example the use of inhaled insulin for diabetes management, the use of inhaled loxapine for treatment of psychiatric disorders. Vaccines, such as the measles-rubella vaccines, can also be delivered via inhalation.

== Examples of inhalers ==
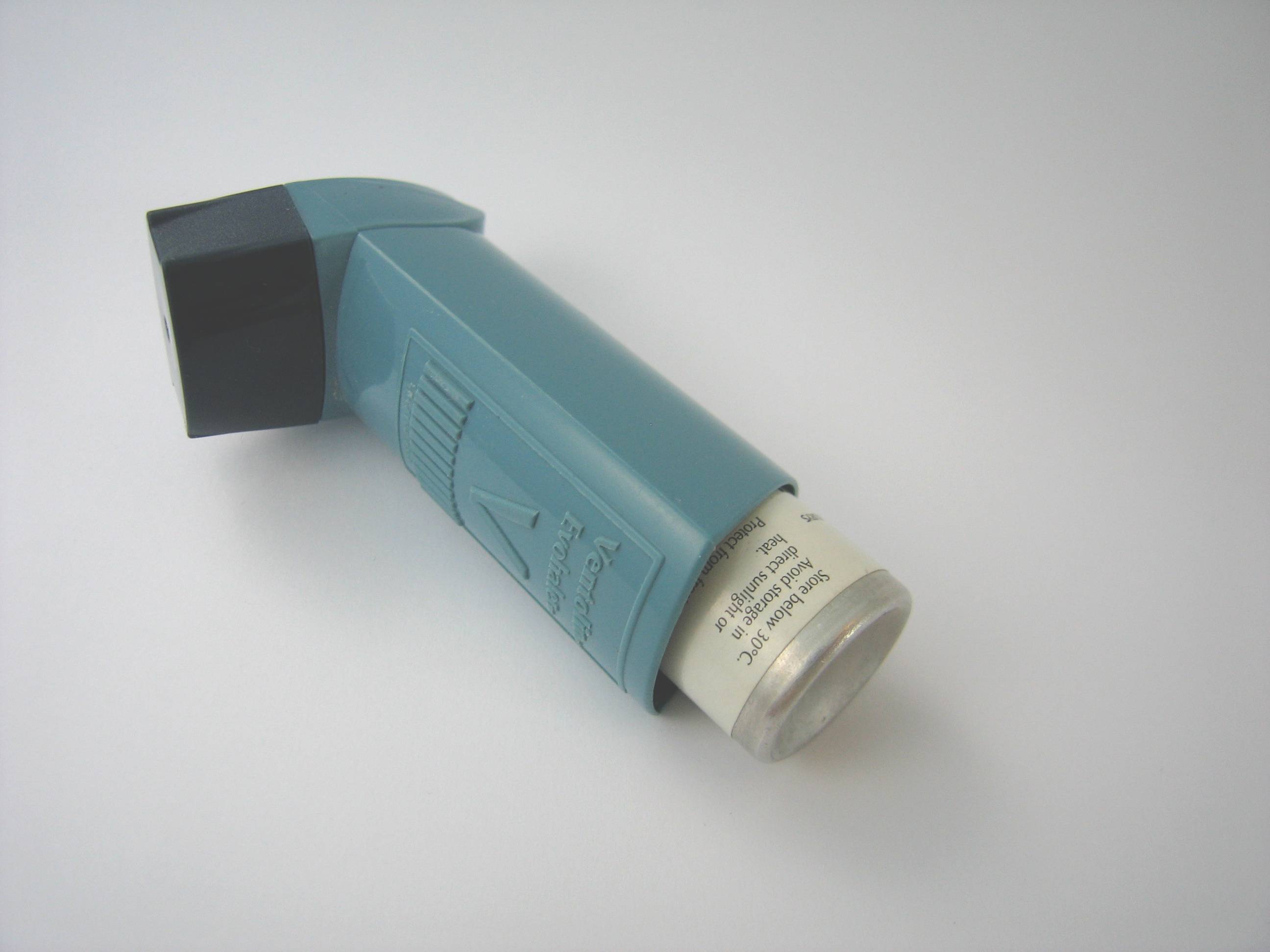
Metered-dose inhaler

=== Metered-dose inhalers (MDIs) ===
Metered-dose inhalers include pressurized metered-dose inhalers (pMDIs) and breath-actuated metered-dose inhalers (BAMDIs). pMDIs are the most commonly used inhalers for treating lung diseases. It requires coordination of patients' inhalation and inhaler actuation. BAMDIs are triggered by patients' inspiratory flow instead of hand actuation, solving the coordination issue. MDIs with spacers have similar effectiveness in drug delivery compared to nebulizers, with additional benefits in convenience and cost-effectiveness. The use of MDIs together with spacers, valved holding chambers (VHCs) or masks improve the efficacy of drug delivery into the lungs.

==== Advantages ====
- High portability
- Fixed dose is delivered
- Efficient aerosolized delivery of drug particles
- Inexpensive
- Convenient usage
- Quiet administration

==== Disadvantages ====
- Require coordination between inhalation and inhaler actuation

==== Examples ====
- Pressurized metered-dose inhalers (pMDIs)
- Breath-actuated metered-dose inhalers (BAMDIs)

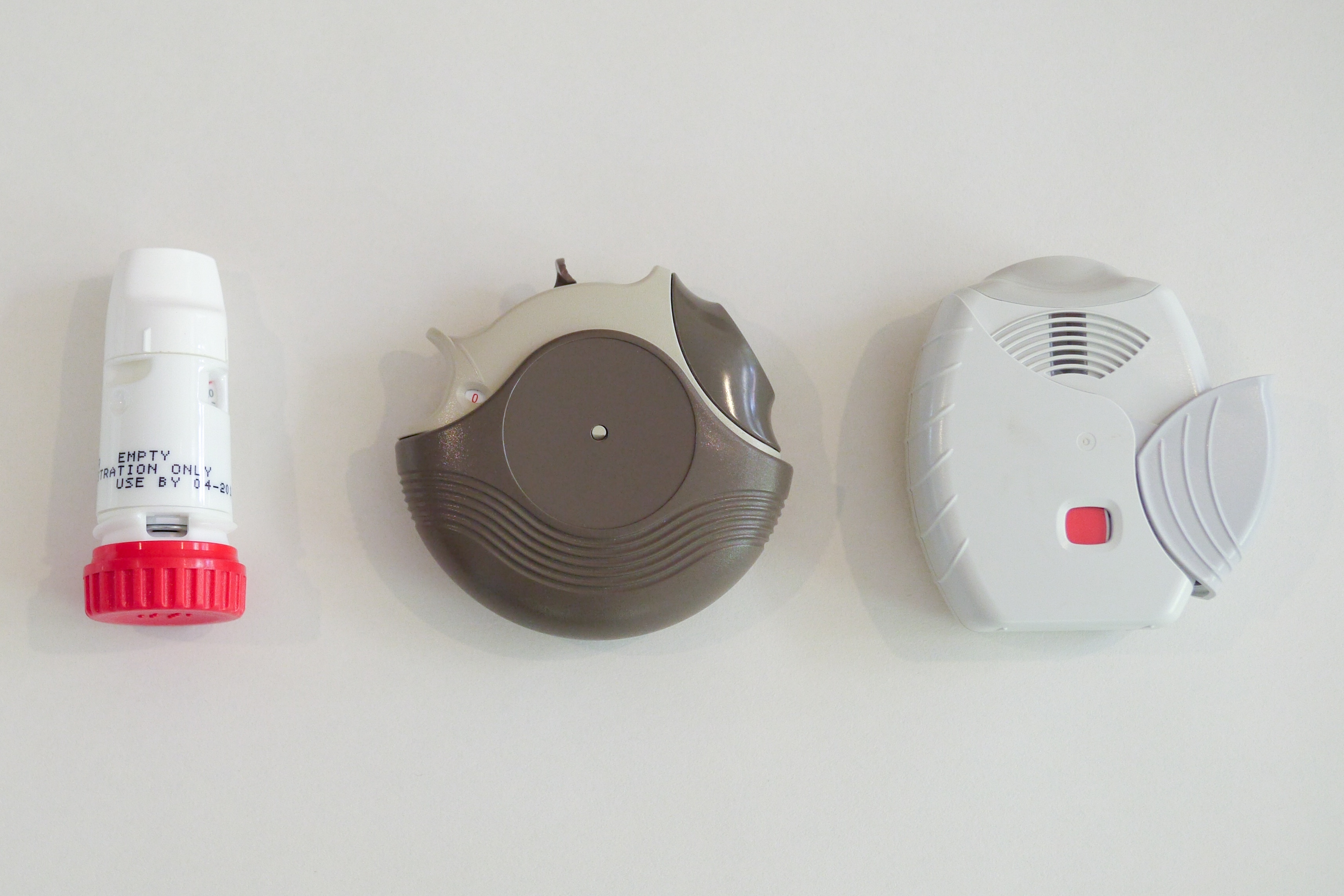
Dry powder inhalers, from left to right: Turbuhaler, Accuhaler, Ellipta

=== Dry powder inhalers (DPIs) ===
The solid drug powders in DPIs are released by the force of the patient's inspiratory flow. Turbulent airflow generated inside the inhaler by the inhalation force is associated with the movement of airflow and the resistance inside the inhaler. Patients should inhale with adequate inspiratory flow to overcome the resistance of DPIs, leading to drug particle deaggregation for successful pulmonary delivery.

==== Advantages ====
- High portability
- Fixed dose is delivered
- Require minimal coordination between inhalation and inhaler actuation

==== Disadvantages ====
- Require adequate inspiratory flow from patients
- Moisture sensitive

==== Examples ====
- Turbuhaler
- Accuhaler
- Handihaler
- Genuair
- Ellipta
- Breexhaler

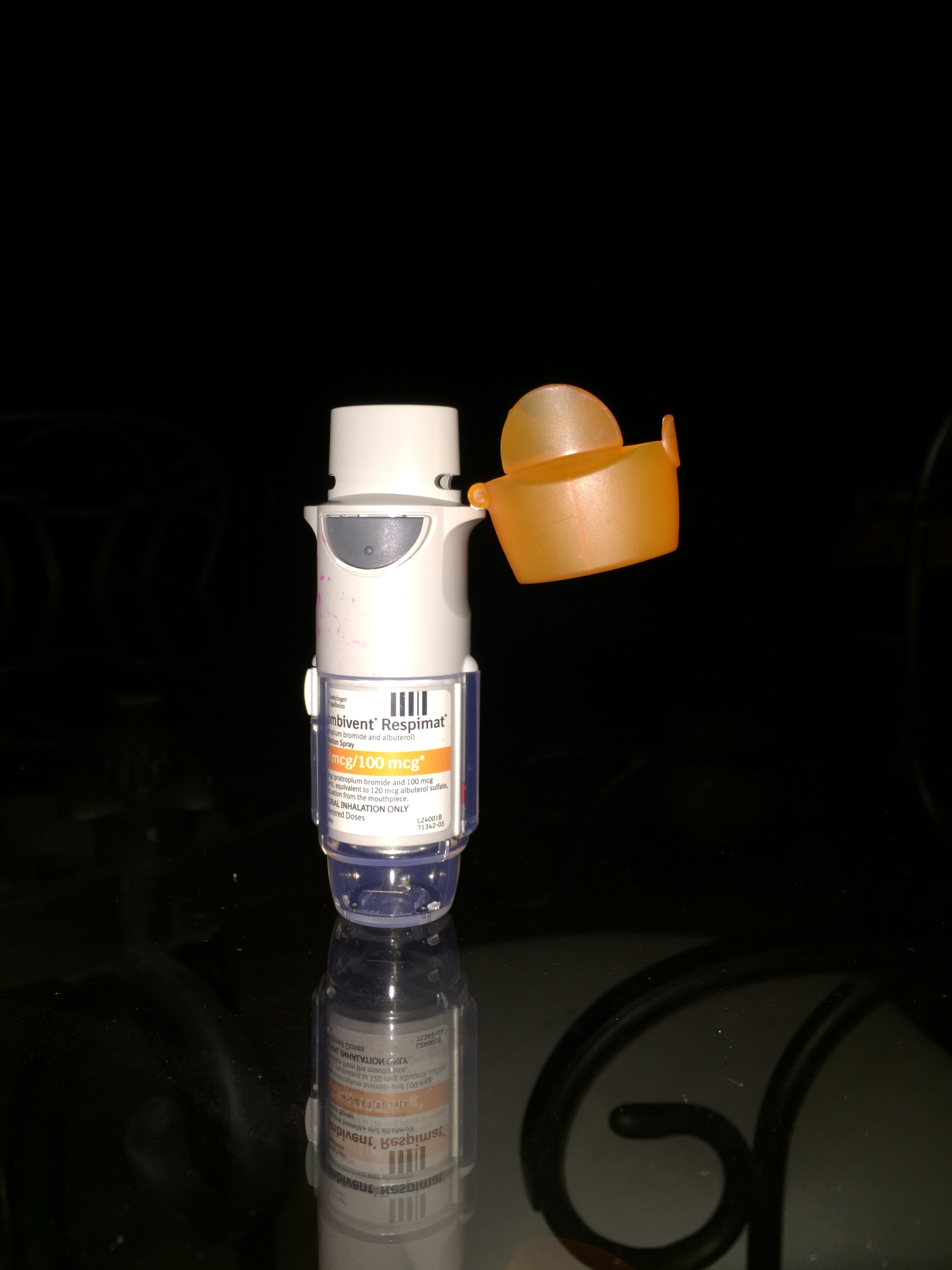
Soft-mist inhaler, Respimat

=== Soft-mist inhalers (SMIs) ===
Soft-mist inhaler aerosolized a fixed dose of liquid drug formulation into inhalable tiny particles through an extremely fine nozzle system using the energy generated by the lever-compressed spring, without the use of propellants. The slow and prolonged duration of aerosolization facilitates the patient's coordination between inhaler actuation and inhalation.

==== Advantages ====
- High portability
- Require minimal patient's coordination between inhalation and inhaler actuation
- High drug deposition in lungs

==== Disadvantages ====
- Low availability in markets
- Relatively expensive

==== Example ====
- Respimat

=== Nebulizers ===
Nebulizer is mainly used in emergencies, or by patients with poor compliance to other handy inhalers. Nebulizer delivers medication into the lungs by converting water-based liquid drug formulations into inhalable droplets mechanically, such as the use of an ultrasonic system, or thermally. Major types of nebulizers include vibrating mesh nebulizers (VMN), jet nebulizers (JN) and ultrasonic nebulizers.

==== Advantages ====
- Patients' education and coordination are not required.
- Suitable for older patients and children
- Better patient satisfaction due to the visible aerosols
- Easily employed with tidal breathing

==== Disadvantages ====
- Long time of drug delivery
- Inaccurate drug dosages
- Bulky device
- Expensive
- Require regular maintenance
- Low drug delivery efficiency to the lungs

==== Examples ====
- Vibrating mesh nebulizers (VMN)
- Jet nebulizers (JN)
- Ultrasound nebulizers

== Factors affecting pulmonary drug delivery ==
To achieve successful pulmonary drug delivery, a fraction of the inhaled particles should not deposit on the upper respiratory tract since they will be swallowed or expectorated without reaching the lungs, leading to the loss of pharmacological effect or provoking unwanted systemic side effects. Factors affecting the deposition of drug particles in lungs include drug particle properties, breathing patterns and respiratory tract geometry.

=== Drug particle properties ===
Particle diameter and particle density significantly affect the drug deposition pattern in the respiratory tract, and are the most common considerations for formulation of pulmonary drugs. Drug particles with diameter larger than 5 μm, predominantly deposit on the upper respiratory tract, limiting the amount of drug particles reaching the lung. Moderate-size drug particles with diameter between 2 μm to 5 μm, primarily deposit on the central and small airways. Small drug particles with diameter smaller than 2 μm, predominantly deposit on the alveolar sacs. Other factors affecting deposition of drugs include particle electrostatic charge, particle shape and particle volatility. Electrostatic charge of the drug particles enhances deposition due to the formation of electrostatic force on the wall of the respiratory tract. Non-spherical particle shape has a different entry pathway compared to that of the spherical particles, causing a change in deposition pattern. Particle volatility affects particle diameter due to the change of particle diameter during condensation and evaporation.

=== Breathing patterns ===
Drug particle deposition is associated with mean residence time and tidal volume. An increase in mean residence time or tidal volume enhances drug deposition in lungs, while an increase in air flow decreases the mean residence time, resulting in the decrease of total deposition of drug particles.

=== Respiratory tract geometry ===
The bifurcation of trachea into bronchi with smaller diameter increases turbulent flow, leading to an increase in deposition in the large respiratory tract by impaction.

== Advantages ==
Several advantages are associated with the pulmonary route of administration. For respiratory diseases, drug can be delivered directly to the disease site to perform topical relief, thus rapid onset of action can be achieved and there is less systemic side effects. Less dosage of drug can also achieve similar therapeutic effect compared to other routes of administration. For drugs designed to exert systemic effect through the lung as a drug target, the drug can reach the circulation bypassing poor gastrointestinal absorption and hepatic first pass metabolism which improve drug bioavailability. The large absorptive surface area, highly permeable membrane with rich blood supply also enable rapid onset of action and increase bioavailability of the drug.

== Disadvantages and challenges ==
Despite a number of advantages in the pulmonary route compared to other routes of administration, numerous disadvantages are associated with the pulmonary route. As the drug needs to be delivered through the respiratory tract to the lungs, drug formulation can be challenging due to the defense mechanisms which intend to remove or inactivate the exogenous chemicals. Airway constriction and mucus secretion with ciliary movement prevent drugs from reaching the lungs, while enzymes, macrophages and surfactant in the lungs may also inactivate the drugs leading to less drug being absorbed. Studies show that only around 20% of drug reaches the lung for each inhalation and drug loss is mainly due to the accumulation in the oropharynx in terms of pMDIs and DPIs and drug retention in the device for nebulisers.

Some irritating drug particles may also cause local side effects at the respiratory tract, for example inhaled corticosteroid accumulating in the oropharynx can result in dysphonia and oral thrush. Besides, drug dosing may be inaccurate due to the variations of breathing patterns between individuals and the presence of numerous factors affecting the deposition and absorption of drug particles in the lungs. In particular, elder patients may not have enough strength to generate sufficient inspiratory flow, resulting in less drug inhalation and hence low drug bioavailability. Finally, inhalers, especially nebulizers, require regular maintenance and cleaning. The inhaler devices are relatively expensive compared to oral tablets, which may not be affordable to low income patients.

The effectiveness of drug delivery highly depends on the patient's compliance and proper inhaler technique with no significant error in using the inhalers. Poor compliance may lead to uncontrolled or poorly controlled disease status. For instance, a patient may feel recovered and discontinue the treatment, or a patient may forget to take the medication, resulting in suboptimal disease management. Reducing the amount of puffs by combination inhalers delivering two or more drugs in one breath or the use of electronic data loggers can improve compliance.

Incorrect inhaler techniques, such as poor coordination, no exhalation before inhaling the drug aerosol or not holding breath for a few seconds after inhalation may lead to medication depositing inside the respiratory tract instead of the lungs, resulting in inefficient and inadequate treatment. Practical demonstration instead of verbal instruction, education and rechecking on the inhaler technique after a period of time can reduce error and enhance true compliance.

== Ongoing development ==
The use of the pulmonary route as an entry into the systemic circulation is constantly developing due to the additional benefits of bypassing the hepatic first pass metabolism, rapid systemic absorption, higher patients compliance and its non-invasive nature. Potent drugs with the ability to penetrate the lung mucosa into the blood circulation may be available for treating diseases requiring systemic drug delivery. The ongoing researches include the use of inhaled nicotine for smoking cessation, the use of inhaled levodopa for the treatment of Parkinson's disease, and the pulmonary delivery of various biologics.

In addition to the development of new pulmonary drugs, the drug formulation and particle engineering technology is advancing, such as the use of Ultrasound Mediated Amorphous to Crystalline transition (UMAX) process to micronize drug into inhalable drug particles with better performance, the use of drug nanoparticles to minimize unwanted drug adverse effects and increase drug bioavailability at the target site, and the use of porous drug particles to improve pulmonary delivery efficacy.

== See also ==
- Route of administration
- Inhaler
- Metered-dose inhaler
- Dry powder inhaler
- Nebulizer
- Respiratory tract
- Respiratory system
- Lung
