= Medical tourism in the Republic of Moldova =

Medical focused tourism in Moldova

Medical tourism in the Republic of Moldova is the branch of the tourism industry, providing treatment to foreign patients.

== History of the medical tourism in Moldova ==
In 2009, medical tourism launched in Moldova, and by 2000, the quality of the Moldova’s medical services has been underestimated, however it was not worse than in the such countries as Germany, France and Italy. Mihail Ceropitoi has made the first steps of the medical tourism development. He was the director of the first dental tourism company, which brought the first foreign patient for treatment in Moldova.

In 2017, the government has made its contribution to the industry also, however did not regulated the field. The most frequent patients of the Moldovan clinics are the Romanian, Russian, Ukrainian, Turkish, Bulgarian and Israel tourists.

Countries	The total percentage of the tourists
Romania	19.3%
Russia	9.8%
Ukraine	8.0%
Poland	5.7%
Turkey	2.0%
Bulgaria	1.4%
Israel	1.2%

In Moldova, the treatment provided by the private clinics is less expensive than in the foreign ordinary hospitals.

According to Stanislav Rusu, the director of the National Tourism Agency, every year over 35% of foreigners, which visit the Republic of Moldova, are coming with treatment purposes. The majority of the medical tourists are looking for the spa resorts in Moldova. In 2018, 15835 foreign citizens have visited Moldova to receive high quality healthcare services.

== Types of medical tourism in Moldova ==
In the Republic of Moldova is relevant not only the medical tourism but also the diagnostic and wellness. The patients from the other countries are exposed to the qualitative exam in the country clinics, and to select and to visit one of tens spa resorts of Moldova.

The disease diagnostic is carried out in accordance with protocols and international medical standards. The patients are in deeply examined in the private clinics supplied with new equipment, which guaranteed the accurate and correct diagnostics. The test results are directly delivered to the patients, based on which the doctor is prescribing a treatment.

There are 80 spa resorts in the Republic of Moldova, which are visited not only by the country citizens but also by the foreign patients annually. In 2018, over 300 medical tourists have been treated in the Moldova’s spa resorts.

== Touristic medical destinations in Moldova ==
The key fields of the medical tourism in Moldova are stomatology, the hepatitis C virus treatment, ophthalmology, plastic surgery and family planning.

=== Stomatology ===
In Moldova, the prices policy for the dental services are less robust, and on the other hand, the quality corresponds to the European. According to the dentists of Moldova, over 70% of the patients are foreigners. Every month, more than 50% of the clients are from Italy, France, America and Russia. The patients are receiving the full service package: dental rehabilitation, prosthesis, caries treatment, removal and teeth whitening.

=== Hepatitis C virus treatment ===
In the Republic of Moldova the Hepatitis C virus treatment, this is one of the key direction of the medical tourism. Starting since 1997 by 2012, the number of the infected persons with Hepatitis C virus in the country reached critical levels – more than 40.000 persons. These are the high rates, considering the fact that the total number of population is 4.057.420. Once the National Program on Hepatitis Treatment was launched, the statistics on morbidity and mortality rates diminished from 6,14% to 1,32% as per 100 000 of population.

In 2018, in Moldova over 4000 of patients have received the free of charge Hepatitis C treatment. Moldovan’s hepatologists, which provide treatment to the thousands of local citizens annually, also provide the treatment to the foreign patients. In the Republic of Moldova, the generic medications are authorized officially for selling, which can’t be purchased in the other countries. Moldova belongs to the low level index development countries and with the large spreading of the hepatitis among the population, thus, the medications are more affordable.

In Moldova, the hepatitis C diagnostic is carried out according to the international standards, by using up-to-date equipment and technologies. The following methods are used to identify the hepatitis C: PCR diagnosis, general and biochemical blood tests, fibroscanation, ultrasound, liver biopsy. The results are given to the patient directly, and the physician curator is engaged in deciphering the tests and doing a detailed treatment course.

In Moldova, foreign patients are screened in private clinics and then undergo treatment including generic treatment including active substances - sofosbuvir, daclatasvir, ledipasvir, velpatasvir. The results of using antiviral therapy reach 97% of fully healed patients, and the medications produce minimal side effects.

=== Ophthalmology ===
Ophthalmology and eye disease treatment are widely used throughout the world. In private clinics in Chişinău, patients are offered the highest diagnostic accuracy of visual acuity, intraocular pressure, biometric and eye tonometry. Medical tourists are attracted by presence of modern ophthalmic equipment, with help of which Moldovan doctors are making the right diagnosis and the treatment is done by new, minimally invasive methods.

Laser vision correction procedures are requiring to be handled by a highly qualified specialist using who are able to use the modern equipment. There are more than 20 clinics in Moldova where experienced doctors work, providing a wide range of ophthalmic services to citizens and non-residents.

=== Plastic surgery ===
Plastic surgery in Moldova is of high demand among the patients from abroad. This direction involves the use of the latest technologies and equipment, and Moldovan surgeons are proven and highly skilled and experienced specialists. In the Republic, esthetic surgery services are provided only in a few private clinics, but this area is progressively developed. The most popular surgeries are the breast surgery and face lift, which are seven times more expensive in Europe than in Moldovan clinics.

=== Family Planning ===
Family planning is a complex and long-lasting process that must take place under the supervision of an experienced specialist. Private centers in Moldova have a good reputation in this field. In addition to a wide range of gynecological and pediatric services, TerraMed, Repromed, Medpark - are using modern ways to overcome infertility, such as in vitro fertilization (IVF). Moldovan doctors contributed to the birth of over 2,000 children.

== System of the medical tourism in Moldova ==
The Moldovan medical tourism system is organized in several stages - first, the patient receives an on-line consultation and then makes an appointment with a specialist and comes for treatment. Therapy and examination of foreign patients is performed only in clinics and private medical centers located in Chişinău. In 2018, over 90 clinics and private medical offices were registered in the city. Most clinics have medical tourism departments that organize trips, accommodation and treatment of foreign patients.

Treatment of the foreign patients is done in the same way as for the citizens of the country under the same conditions, without additional margins. Before the treatment, the patient transfer a deposit, which is returned at the end of treatment.

The cost of treatment varies slightly among medical institutions in the country, depending on the location and nature of the services provided. In choosing a clinic, foreign patients assess reviews of physicians working in it and the reputation of the medical center.

Moldovan doctors speak well Romanian and Russian but, if necessary, an experienced translator is employed for a foreign patient who helps him to communicate with doctors during his stay in the Republic of Moldova.

Medical tourists choose clinics and doctors who will treat them, but they can also seek help from companies involved in organizing medical excursions.

== Agencies of the medical tourism in Moldova ==
The medical tourism in Moldova is at the inception stage of development, so there are not so many agencies involved in organizing medical excursions in the country. There are few official specialized companies that provide treatment to foreign tourists in Moldova, but they are developing successfully.

=== Travel To Dentist ===
Travel To Dentist Company is the first company that provide healthcare services to the non-residents. The travel agency collaborates with the best dental clinics in Moldova and offers annual trips to patients in Italy, France, Spain and the UK.

Employees of the organization are booking tickets and hotels, offering assistants and translators for foreign patients. From 2009 until 2018, according to the company's director, more than 1000 tourists used the services of the Moldovan dentists.

== See also ==
- Hepatitis C treatment in Moldova
