= Uprifosbuvir =

Chemical compound

Clinical data
- Trade names: Uprifosbuvir

Legal status
- Legal status: US: Investigational New Drug

Identifiers
- IUPAC name: propan-2-yl (2R)-2-[[[(2R,3R,4R,5R)-4-chloro-5-(2,4-dioxopyrimidin-1-yl)-3-hydroxy-4-methyloxolan-2-yl]methoxy-phenoxyphosphoryl]amino]propanoate
- CAS Number: 1496551-77-9
- PubChem CID: 90055716
- DrugBank: DB15206
- ChemSpider: 57427403
- UNII: JW31KPS26S
- KEGG: D10996
- ChEMBL: ChEMBL3833371

Chemical and physical data
- Formula: C_{22}H_{29}ClN_{3}O_{9}P
- Molar mass: 545.91 g·mol^{−1}
- 3D model (JSmol): Interactive image
- SMILES: C[C@H](C(=O)OC(C)C)N[P@@](=O)(OC[C@@H]1[C@H]([C@@]([C@@H](O1)N2C=CC(=O)NC2=O)(C)Cl)O)OC3=CC=CC=C3
- InChI: InChI=1S/C22H29ClN3O9P/c1-13(2)33-19(29)14(3)25-36(31,35-15-8-6-5-7-9-15)32-12-16-18(28)22(4,23)20(34-16)26-11-10-17(27)24-21(26)30/h5-11,13-14,16,18,20,28H,12H2,1-4H3,(H,25,31)(H,24,27,30)/t14-,16-,18-,20-,22-,36-/m1/s1; Key:SFPFZQKYPOWCSI-KHFYHRBSSA-N

Uprifosbuvir (MK-3682) is an antiviral drug developed for the treatment of hepatitis C. It is a nucleotide analogue which acts as an NS5B RNA polymerase inhibitor. As of 2019 it was in Phase III human clinical trials.

In 2017 owner Merck wrote down the value of uprifosbuvir to US$240 million, for a write-down of $2.9 billion, reducing its earnings per share from 42¢ to a loss of 22¢ for the fourth quarter of 2016. This was attributed to the hepatitis C drug market rather than uprifosbuvir itself; the population of treatable patients diminished rapidly after the introduction in 2014 of sofosbuvir and the combination ledipasvir/sofosbuvir, drugs that cured hepatitis C, and whose market was also diminishing following their success in curing patients. Clinical testing of uprifosbuvir continued.
