= NS5B inhibitor =

Class of pharmaceutical drugs

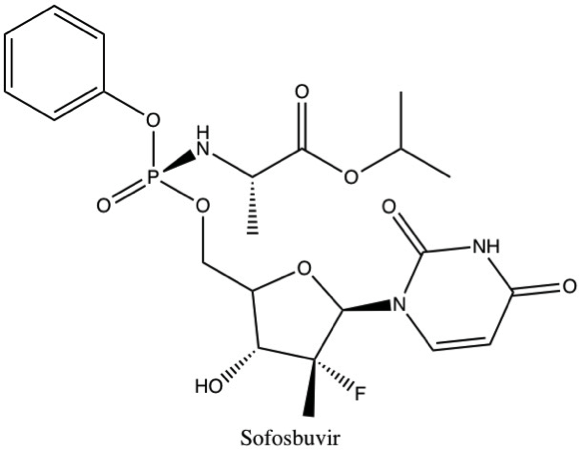
Sofosbuvir, the first nucleoside analogue inhibitor approved by the FDA

Non-structural protein 5B (NS5B) inhibitors are a class of direct-acting antivirals widely used in the treatment of chronic hepatitis C. Depending on site of action and chemical composition, NS5B inhibitors may be categorized into three classes—nucleoside active site inhibitors (NIs), non-nucleoside allosteric inhibitors, and pyrophosphate analogues. Subsequently, all three classes are then subclassified. All inhibit RNA synthesis by NS5B but at different stages/sites resulting in inability of viral RNA replication. Expression of direct-acting NS5B inhibitors does not take place in cells that are not infected by hepatitis C virus, which seems to be beneficial for this class of drugs.

Low efficacy, serious side effects, development of resistance of previously available hepatitis C treatments were the greatest concerns prior to the development of direct-acting antivirals, and remained a problem at the beginning of their development. Therefore, combinational direct-acting antiviral therapies were preferable. Research has demonstrated that specific anti-hepatitis C virus agents such as NS5B inhibitors lead to improved efficacy and tolerability.

== Medical uses ==
Hepatitis C is one of the most significant diseases to affect humans but despite its global impact, there are no vaccines or effective therapies without major side effects. The hepatitis C virus non-structural protein 5B (NS5B) has become a target of choice for the development of anti-hepatitis C virus drugs, as it is not expressed in cells that are not infected by hepatitis C virus. The treatment for patients with chronic hepatitis C that was used prior to the development of direct-acting antivirals was ribavirin plus pegylated interferon alfa-2a. This treatment was dissatisfactory in many cases, both for the lack of efficacy and because of side effects.

Sofosbuvir, a highly potent inhibitor of the NS5B polymerase, is active across all genotype of hepatitis C virus. It has high efficacy in combination with several other drugs, like ledipasvir, either with or without peginterferon-alfa. It has many advantages due to its tolerability, high potency, high resistance barrier, low side effects and oral administration. Another advantage of sofosbuvir is the low rates of interactions with other drugs, as its metabolism does not go through the CYP3A4 pathway. However, its cost can be a challenge, as all the new direct-acting antiviral drugs can be very expensive.

== Adverse effects ==
Comparing the virological response of NS5B inhibitors to previous therapy of chronic hepatitis C with the combination of interferon and ribavirin, it was possible to observe a significant difference in efficacy and safety. The efficacy rate of interferon plus ribavirin varied within 44–46% while it increases up to 90% by direct-acting antivirals such as NS5B inhibitors/ Data on the frequency of side effects may vary between researches for both drug categories. Nevertheless, there is a significant difference between the safety profiles of NS5B inhibitors, particularly sofosbuvir and the combination of interferon and ribavirin. Comparing interferon containing therapies, sofosbuvir does not cause neutropenia, thrombocytopenia, or any other serious adverse effects. Common side effects associated with sofosbuvir are headache, tiredness, insomnia, dizziness, itching, infections of upper respiratory tract, rashes, back pain, anemia, and lymphopenia. With the advent of direct-acting antivirals, the duration of the hepatitis treatment has also been impressively reduced. Severity of adverse effects is strongly associated with duration of therapy and the dose used for hepatitis C treatment. Therefore, direct-acting antivirals have become the initial treatment used for most patients with chronic hepatitis C.

== Hepatitis C virus ==
Hepatitis C virus belongs to the family Flaviviridae and genus hepavirus. It is a small enveloped, single stranded RNA virus with positive polarity. A lipid bilayer which contains two viral glycoproteins, E1 and E2, forms the envelope and virion.

Hepatitis C virus is transmitted through exposure to infected blood or body fluids, and the most common route is through injection by infected needles. In the beginning of the hepatitis C virus life cycle, virions bind to specific receptors on hepatocytes. The virus is internalized and the nucleocapsid is released into the cytoplasm of the hepatocyte after binding with the receptor. The NS5B protein, which is an RNA-dependent RNA polymerase, catalyzes hepatitis C virus replication.

The hepatitis C virus can cause acute infection but most patients are asymptomatic upon exposure. About one-third of patients develop symptoms such as fatigue, arthralgia and jaundice. About 15–45% of patients diagnosed with acute infection may clear the virus without treatment. After acute infection, most infected patients will develop chronic infection which increases the risk for later developing life-threatening conditions, like liver cirrhosis and hepatocellular carcinoma.

In 2015, about 71 million individuals throughout the world were living with chronic hepatitis C and there were 1.75 million new hepatitis C virus infections that same year. With highly effective direct-acting antivirals, hepatitis C can be cured within 2 to 3 months.

== NS5B receptor ==
NS5B is a viral protein that can be found in the hepatitis C virus and is an important enzyme in the replication process. The protein is an RNA-dependent RNA polymerase, which means that it uses single-stranded RNA (ssRNA) as a template to form double-stranded RNA (dsRNA). It contains 591 amino acids with the last 21 amino acids at the C-terminal end functioning as a cell membrane anchor that is hydrophobic in nature. NS5B is therefore categorized as a membrane protein, termed as a "tail-anchored protein".

The structure of NS5B is similar to other viral polynucleotide polymerases and is made up of three subdomains. The structure resembles a right hand with a palm domain that acts as the foundation for the active site, a finger domain, and a thumb domain. The thumb and finger domains encircle the active site of the enzyme.

The finger domain has two loops, named Λ1 and Λ2, that reach over and interact with the top of the thumb domain to enclose the active site. These two loops promote the NS5B to maintain its closed conformation that is necessary for nucleic acid binding and for cramping movement of the enzyme across the RNA template elongation process. NS5B also has allosteric sites in addition to the active site. Palm I, domain close to the active site, palm II, partly overlapping palm I and towards the active site, thumb I, thumb domain near the fingertips and thumb II, the outer surface of the thumb domain.

== Mechanism of action ==
There are three known classes of NS5B inhibitors: non-nucleoside analogue inhibitors, nucleoside/nucleotide analogue inhibitors, and pyrophosphate analogues. The classes differ in their structure and where they bind to the NS5B protein: at allosteric binding sites, the enzyme active site, or the pyrophosphate binding site, respectively.

=== Nucleoside analogue inhibitors ===
Nucleoside analogue inhibitors terminate the RNA synthesis essential for RNA replication. They do so by being incorporated by the RNA-dependent RNA polymerase, which prevents incoming nucleotides from being added to the RNA chain. It has been proposed that steric hindrance by the nucleoside inhibitors, which contain a 3'-hydroxyl group, is the reason for the chain termination. Because of this mechanism, nucleoside inhibitors are sometimes called chain terminating inhibitors. Nucleoside inhibitors of hepatitis C virus are developed as prodrugs and eventually get cleaved at their site of action in the liver by hepatic enzymes, and go through phosphorylation into a triphosphate form to become active to target the polymerase at its highly conserved active site.

=== Non-nucleoside analogue inhibitors ===
Non-nucleoside analogue inhibitors are a diverse class of NS5B inhibitors. They can be arranged into three categories based on their binding sites: active site inhibitors, allosteric site inhibitors and miscellaneous site inhibitors. The miscellaneous site inhibitors are those inhibitors do not yet have a defined binding site. As of 2015, five different allosteric binding sites have been discovered for the non-nucleoside analogue inhibitors of hepatitis C virus. Two of them are located at the thumb domain of the polymerase and the other three in the palm domain. The non-nucleoside analogue inhibitors inhibit the polymerase activity in different ways, which depend on the allosteric site to which the inhibitor binds. In contrast to the nucleoside inhibitors, non-nucleoside analogue inhibitors do not compete with nucleotides nor the RNA template. Instead, by binding to RNA-dependent RNA polymerase, they inhibit polymerase activity by inhibiting conformational changes which are necessary for NS5B activity.

=== Pyrophosphate analogue inhibitors ===
Pyrophosphate analogue inhibitors mimic the inorganic pyrophosphate. During the nucleotidyl-transfer reaction, an enzymatic reaction fundamental for DNA synthesis, pyrophosphate is released, which binds to certain binding sites at the NS5B polymerase. This binding site is also the binding site for β- and 𝛾-phosphate of nucleotide triphosphates which are added to the RNA chain in the ongoing RNA replication.

The pyrophosphates are a necessary component of the nucleotide incorporation in the RNA replication. Pyrophosphate inhibitors bind to the active site of the polymerase in competition both with the nucleotides and pyrophosphate, which results in a nucleophilic attack on the terminal phosphodiester bond of the newly released pyrophosphate and thereby stops the RNA replication.

== Drug discovery and development ==
=== Discovery ===
The NS5B crystal structure was first reported in literature by three different research groups in 1999. After that, the NS5B RNA dependent RNA polymerase was pursued as a target for the development of treatments for hepatitis C. With crystallized X-ray structures, high-throughput screening, enzyme and cell based replicon assays, and animal models for screening, many potential drug candidates were discovered but few have been approved.

=== Development ===
Many structurally different compounds inhibit NS5B polymerase at different binding sites, but relatively few candidates meet the requirements for selectivity, acceptable pK and toxicity profiles. Direct-acting antivirals were an important advancement in the treatment of chronic hepatitis C. In December 2013, sofosbuvir was approved by the FDA and in October 2014, ledipasvir and sofosbuvir were approved in a combination tablet. The progress in the development of direct-acting antivirals has been very rapid and there are several anti-hepatitis C virus agents in clinical trials.

=== Structure–activity relationship ===
==== Nucleoside Inhibitors ====
Nucleoside inhibitors of hepatitis C virus NS5B are classified into three major classes: purine nucleoside, inhibitors, pyrimidine nucleoside inhibitors, and miscellaneous nucleoside inhibitors. Sofosbuvir is a pyrimidine nucleoside analog and a phosphoramidite prodrug.

==== Pyrimidine nucleoside inhibitors ====
The isomeric form of the amino acid matters since the D-alanine derivative is inactive which means that the natural L-amino acid is required for activity. When observing the amino acid side chain (R_{1}) a small alkyl group is a viable substitution, but the potency reduces significantly if the substitution is larger than ethyl. Methyl has the greatest potency and is, therefore, a viable substitution.

When the amino acid is alanine and the phosphate ester is phenyl substituent the groups at the carboxylic acid ester (R_{2}) that provide the desired submicromolar activity are small alkyl groups and branched alkyl groups, for example, methyl, ethyl, isopropyl, n-butyl and 2-butyl. But cytotoxicity is observed with n-butyl, 2-butyl and n-pentyl esters. Phenyl and halogenated alkyl groups do not provide enough potency enhancement.

When evaluating the phosphoramidate ester substituent (R_{3}) the 1-naphthyl ester has the greatest potency but it is also cytotoxic so it is not a viable substituent. Mono- and dihalogenerated phenolic esters also have good potency but they are also cytotoxic. A derivative with phenol as a substituent has good potency and is not cytotoxic. The cyclohexyl ester derivatives make the most difference in the structure activity relationship as they show as much as 10-fold improvement in potency.

Table 1: Structure–activity relationship of pyrimidine nucleoside inhibitors
Compound	R_{1}	R_{2}	R_{3}	EC_{90}	Inhibition of cellular rRNA replication at 50 μM (%)
1	Methyl	Methyl	Phenyl	1.62	0.0
2	Methyl	Isopropyl	Phenyl	0.52	25.9
3	Methyl	c-Hexyl	Phenyl	0.25	61.1
4	Methyl	Ethyl	4-F-Phenyl	0.76	55.3
5	Methyl	Isopropyl	4-F-Phenyl	0.77	0.0
6	Methyl	Isopropyl	4-Cl-Phenyl	0.42	0.0
7	Methyl	c-Hexyl	4-F-Phenyl	0.04	52.1

==== Non-nucleoside Inhibitors ====
Based on different binding site characteristics, non-nucleoside inhibitors of hepatitis C virus NS5B are classified into three distinct categories: active site inhibitors, allosteric site inhibitors, and miscellaneous non-nucleoside inhibitors. For miscellaneous non-nucleoside analogue inhibitors, the binding site is either not defined or under further investigation.

==== Allosteric site inhibitors ====
Allosteric site inhibitors are a large group within the non-nucleoside category with at least 10 different analogs that are known. One of these allosteric inhibitors is N-benzoyl pyrrolidine.

In 2005 GlaxoSmithKline identified N-benzoyl pyrrolidine as a NS5B inhibitor through high-throughput screening. An isobutyl analog (table 2) showed IC50=0.7 μM submicromolar activity against NS5B. In the development, 5-phenyl was replaced with different heterocycles to try to optimize the inhibition, compounds (2-4). The 2-pyridyl (4) group was well tolerated on the pyrrolidine scaffold, whereas replacement with 2-thienyl led to compound (5) with IC50= 0,3 μM. To get a high degree of enantiospecificity for the enzyme-inhibitor reaction, a (+) enantiomer of (5) was determined to be more potent than its (–) counterpart. These compounds all bind to the palm region of the NS5B polymerase in an allosteric pocket. Further developments were made by Burton G in 2007 to optimize the acyl pyrrolidine scaffold to achieve replicon activity. Replacing thiophene with thiazole in N-acyl pyrrolidine scaffold produced analog (6) to achieve great enzyme activity, IC50=40nM. Nonetheless, this series of compounds had low cellular permeability. The most potent analog during the optimization of cellular activity of this series was (7) with IC50 = 5nM and EC50 = 0.61 μM. The problem with this compound (7) was poor oral bioavailability and poor absorption. To achieve a better pharmacokinetic profile, modifications to the structure led to compound (8) with EC50 of 0.39 μM and an oral bioavailability of about 50%. This compound was then selected as a drug candidate for further development as a combination therapy with peginterferon alfa-2a.

Table 2: The effect of structural changes to N-benzoylpyrrolidine structure on inhibitory activity
Compound	R_{1}	R_{2}	R_{3}	R_{4}	NS5B IC_{50} (μM)
1	–	–	–	–	0.7
2	COOH	2-thiazolyl	CF_{3}	H	0.4
3	COOH	2-furanyl	CF_{3}	H	0.8
4	COOH	2-pyridyl	CF_{3}	H	0.7
5	COOH	2-thienyl	CF_{3}	H	0.3
6	CONHSO_{2}CH_{3}	2-thiazolyl	t-Bu	H	0.04
7	CONH_{2}	2-thiazolyl	t-Bu	OCH_{3}	0.005
8	CH_{2}OCH_{3}	2-thiazolyl	t-Bu	OCH_{3}	0.44

== History ==
Dynamic evolution of drug discovery started in early 1960s after hepatitis A and B types were recognized. Numerous medications have been tested in hopes of positive results. Interferon was one of the first that demonstrated effectiveness. Subsequently, three different variations of interferon alfa, beta and gamma were identified.

1986 – Non-A, non-B hepatitis was identified as hepatitis C, which was the impetus for further researches in drug development.

1990s – The dose and length of treatment with interferon were established. At approximately same time, ribavirin was added to interferon therapy, thereby exceeding a sustained virological response of 50%.

2001 – Pegylated interferon was approved. Pegylation of interferon enhanced its half-life at the same time leading to increase of sustained virological response and reducing injection frequency.

Because of the relatively low efficacy and tolerability of interferon and ribavirin, intense investigations in the development of direct-acting antivirals were undertaken. Expression of direct-acting antivirals does not occur in uninfected cells, therefore, improving its tolerability and efficacy in most genotypes of hepatitis C, up to 90%.

2011 – The first direct-acting antiviral or NS3/4A (protease inhibitor) boceprevir was approved. Thereafter other inhibitors in this class telaprevir, simeprevir, asunaprevir, paritaprevir and grazoprevir were approved.

2013 – The first NS5B polymerase inhibitor sofosbuvir approved. Dasabuvir was approved in 2014.

2014 – The first NS5A inhibitor ledipasvir was approved. Four other NS5A inhibitors of this class—daclatasvir, ombitasvir, elbasvir and velpatasvir—have been subsequently approved.

All direct-acting antivirals are used as a part of combination therapies leading to better achievements than single drugs in treatment of chronic hepatitis C.
