= C30H41NO6S =

The molecular formula C_{30}H_{41}NO_{6}S (molar mass: 543.25 g/mol) may refer to:

- Radalbuvir
- Sagopilone
