= IDX-184 =

Chemical compound

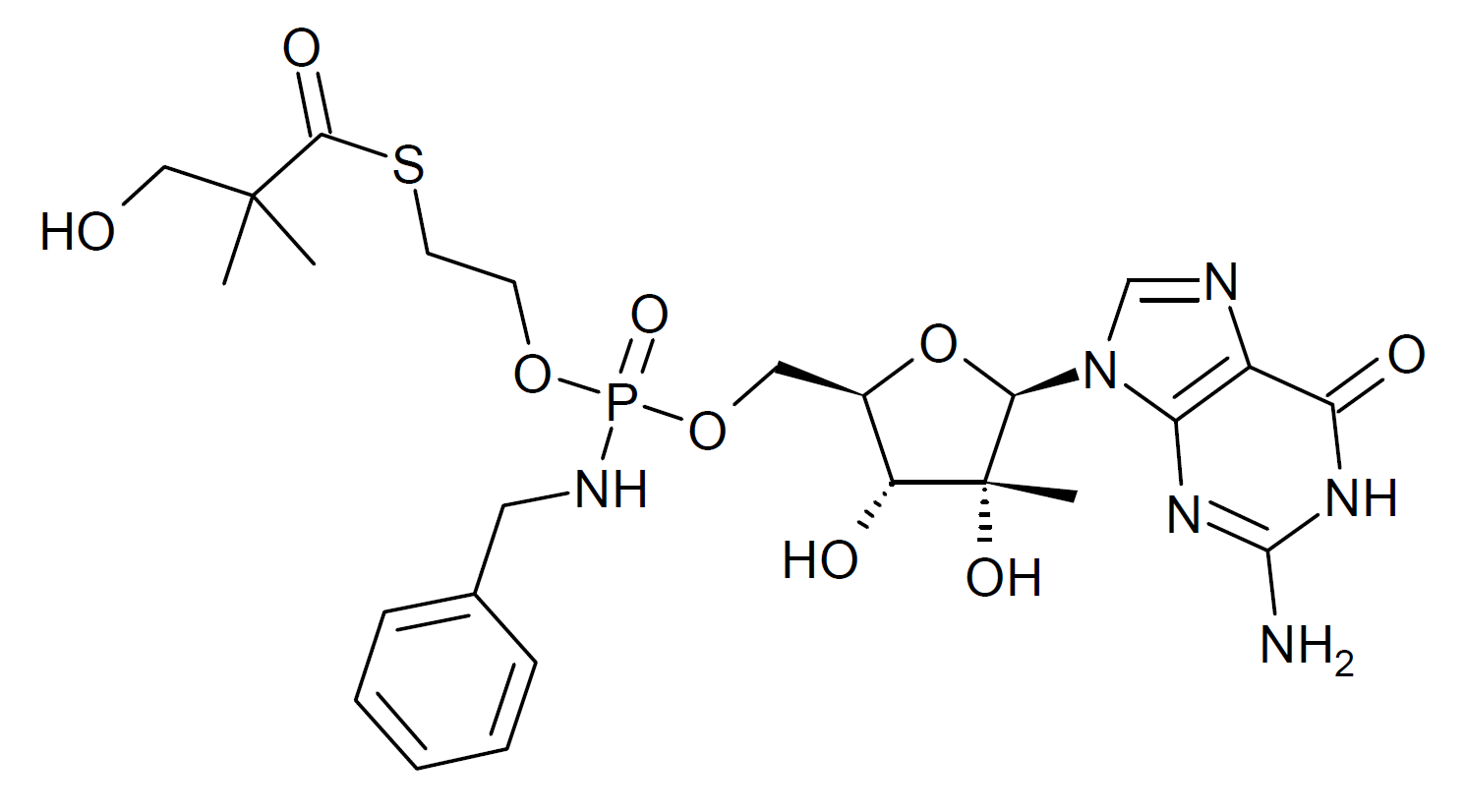

Legal status
- Legal status: US: Investigational drug

Identifiers
- IUPAC name: S-[2-{[(2R,3R,4R,5R)-5-(2-amino-6-oxo-1H-purin-9-yl)-3,4-dihydroxy-4-methyloxolan-2-yl]methoxy-(benzylamino)phosphoryl}oxyethyl] 3-hydroxy-2,2-dimethylpropanethioate
- CAS Number: 1036915-08-8
- PubChem CID: 135565589
- ChemSpider: 34066446
- UNII: 4W44B4S9OC
- ChEMBL: ChEMBL3793161

Chemical and physical data
- Formula: C_{25}H_{35}N_{6}O_{9}PS
- Molar mass: 626.62 g·mol^{−1}
- 3D model (JSmol): Interactive image
- SMILES: C[C@]1([C@@H]([C@H](O[C@H]1N2C=NC3=C2N=C(NC3=O)N)COP(=O)(NCC4=CC=CC=C4)OCCSC(=O)C(C)(C)CO)O)O
- InChI: InChI=1S/C25H35N6O9PS/c1-24(2,13-32)22(35)42-10-9-38-41(37,28-11-15-7-5-4-6-8-15)39-12-16-18(33)25(3,36)21(40-16)31-14-27-17-19(31)29-23(26)30-20(17)34/h4-8,14,16,18,21,32-33,36H,9-13H2,1-3H3,(H,28,37)(H3,26,29,30,34)/t16-,18-,21-,25-,41?/m1/s1; Key:FGHMGRXAHIXTBM-TWFJNEQDSA-N

IDX-184 is an antiviral drug which was developed as a treatment for hepatitis C, acting as a NS5B RNA polymerase inhibitor. While it showed reasonable effectiveness in early clinical trials it did not progress past Phase IIb. However research using this drug has continued as it shows potentially useful activity against other emerging viral diseases such as Zika virus, and coronaviruses including MERS, and SARS-CoV-2.
