= JTK-109 =

Antiviral drug

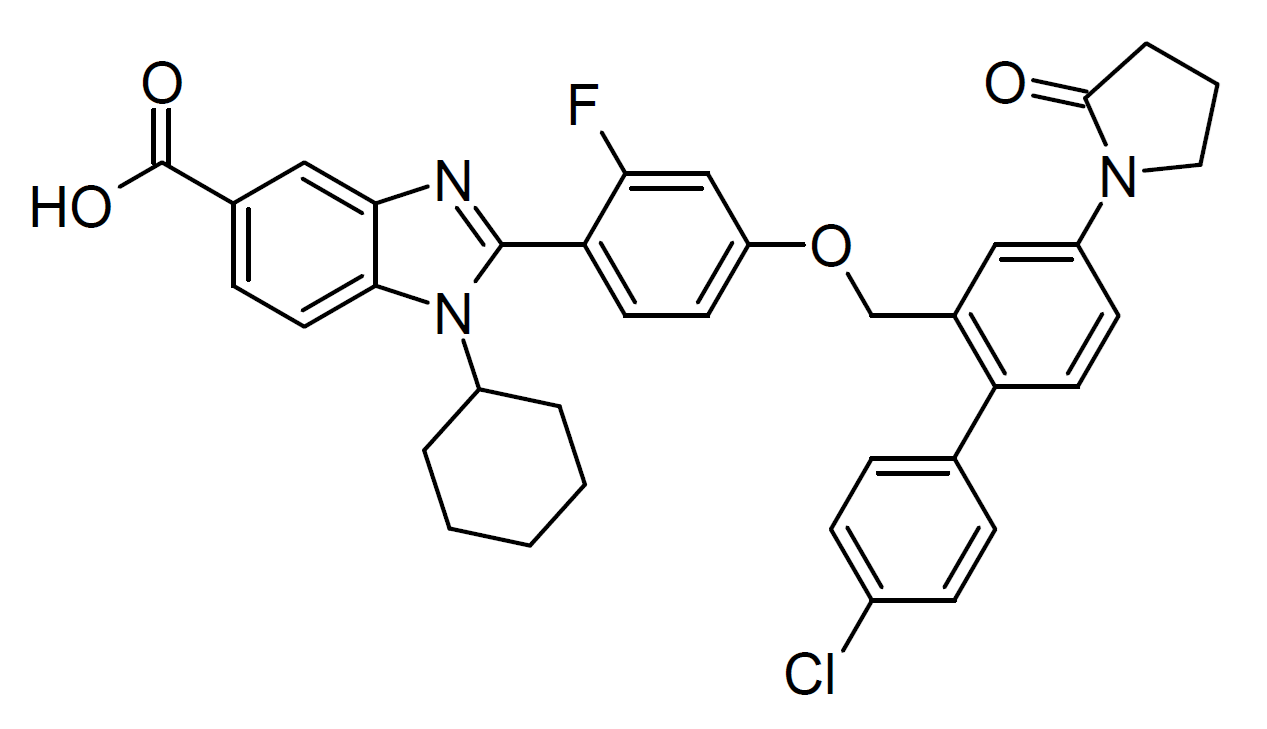

Identifiers
- IUPAC name: 2-[4-[[2-(4-chlorophenyl)-5-(2-oxopyrrolidin-1-yl)phenyl]methoxy]-2-fluorophenyl]-1-cyclohexylbenzimidazole-5-carboxylic acid
- CAS Number: 480462-62-2
- PubChem CID: 11686018
- ChemSpider: 9860746
- UNII: BJA28665XS
- ChEMBL: ChEMBL210297

Chemical and physical data
- Formula: C_{37}H_{33}ClFN_{3}O_{4}
- Molar mass: 638.14 g·mol^{−1}
- 3D model (JSmol): Interactive image
- SMILES: C1CCC(CC1)N2C3=C(C=C(C=C3)C(=O)O)N=C2C4=C(C=C(C=C4)OCC5=C(C=CC(=C5)N6CCCC6=O)C7=CC=C(C=C7)Cl)F
- InChI: InChI=1S/C37H33ClFN3O4/c38-26-11-8-23(9-12-26)30-15-13-28(41-18-4-7-35(41)43)19-25(30)22-46-29-14-16-31(32(39)21-29)36-40-33-20-24(37(44)45)10-17-34(33)42(36)27-5-2-1-3-6-27/h8-17,19-21,27H,1-7,18,22H2,(H,44,45); Key:NIBYCXOKANETJM-UHFFFAOYSA-N

JTK-109 is an antiviral drug which acts as a NS5B RNA-dependent RNA polymerase inhibitor. It was initially developed for the treatment of Hepatitis C, but also shows activity against caliciviruses such as norovirus.
