= Palisaded neutrophilic and granulomatous dermatitis =

Connective tissue disease

- Specialty: Dermatology

Palisaded neutrophilic and granulomatous dermatitis (PNGS) is usually associated with a well-defined connective tissue disease, lupus erythematosus or rheumatoid arthritis most commonly, and often presents with eroded or ulcerated symmetrically distributed umbilicated papules or nodules on the elbows.

== Signs and symptoms ==
Typical clinical manifestations include erythematous to violaceous plaques that are symmetrically distributed, skin-colored linear cords involving the lateral trunks, and skin-colored or erythematous papules with crusting, perforation, or umbilication.

== Causes ==
Palisaded neutrophilic and granulomatous dermaititis is associated with subacute bacterial endocarditis, ledipasvir/sofosbuvir, allopurinol, Hodgkin’s and non-Hodgkin’s lymphoma, chronic myelomonocytic leukemia, ulcerative colitis, Takayasu arteritis, systemic vasculitis, systemic lupus erythematosus (SLE), sarcoidosis, rheumatoid arthritis, eosinophilic granulomatosis with polyangiitis, chronic uveitis, and adult-onset Still’s disease.

== Treatment ==
The underlying illness is the main focus of PNGD treatment. Up to 20% of patients may experience spontaneous resolution of the lesions. Topical corticosteroids, NSAIDs (non-steroidal anti-inflammatory drugs), dapsone, prednisone, colchicine, oral tacrolimus, and TNF inhibitors are among the available treatment options.

== See also ==
- Skin lesion
- List of cutaneous conditions
