= Protide =

Means of delivering drugs to a cell

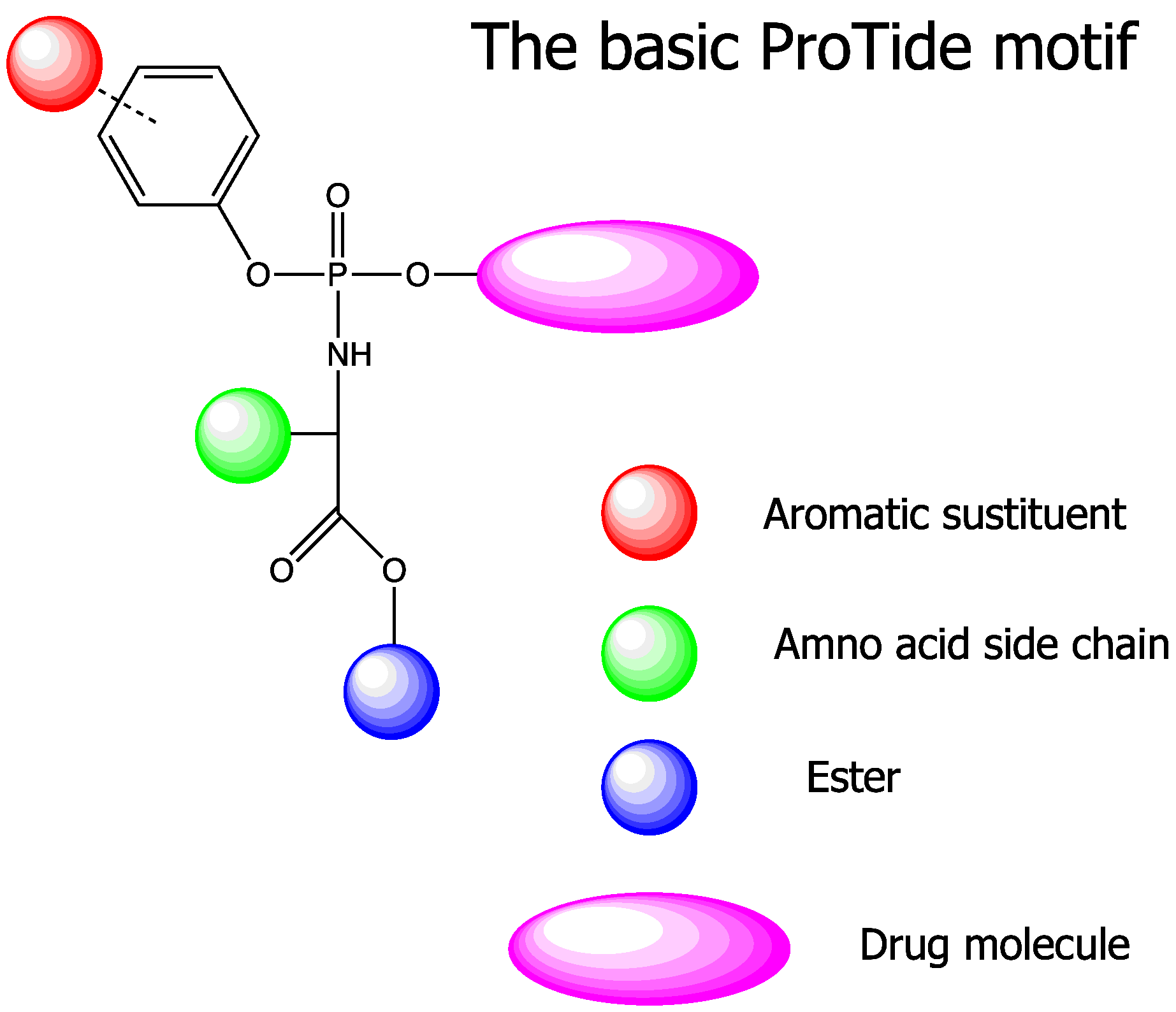
General representation of a ProTide

The ProTide technology is a prodrug approach used in molecular biology and drug design. It is designed to deliver nucleotide analogues (as monophosphate) into the cell (ProTide: PROdrug + nucleoTIDE). This technology was invented by Professor Chris McGuigan from the School of Pharmacy and Pharmaceutical Sciences at Cardiff University in the early 1990s. ProTides form a critical part of antiviral drugs such as sofosbuvir, tenofovir alafenamide, and remdesivir.

== Development ==
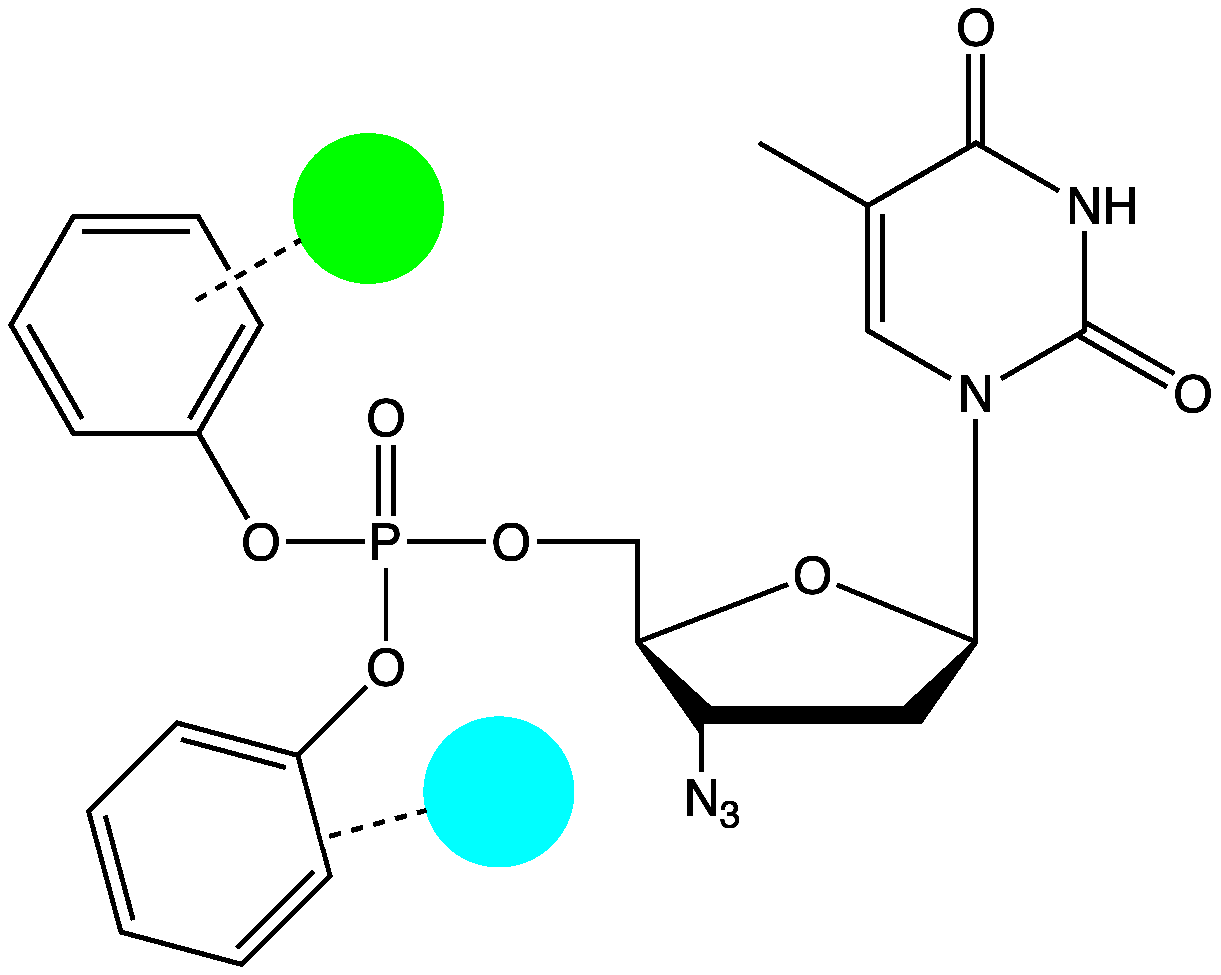
A generic diaryl phosphate pro-drug of AZT

The first demonstration of the ProTide approach was made in 1992, when the efficiency of aryloxy phosphates and phosphoramidates was noted. In particular, diaryl phosphates were prepared from zidovudine (AZT) using simple phosphorochloridate chemistry. For the first time, the anti-HIV activity of these phosphate derivatives of AZT exceeded that of the parent nucleoside in some cases. Moreover, while AZT was almost inactive (EC^{50} 100μM) in the JM cell line, the substituted diaryl phosphate was 10 times more active (EC^{50} 10μM). At the time, JM was considered AZT-insensitive due to poor phosphorylation. It later emerged that an AZT-efflux pump was the source of this poor AZT sensitivity. However, the conclusion remains valid that the diaryl phosphate was more able to retain activity in the JM cell line and that this may imply a (small) degree of intracellular phosphate delivery. The electron-withdrawing power of the p-nitro groups and putative enhancements in aryl leaving group ability were suggested as the major driving force of this SAR.

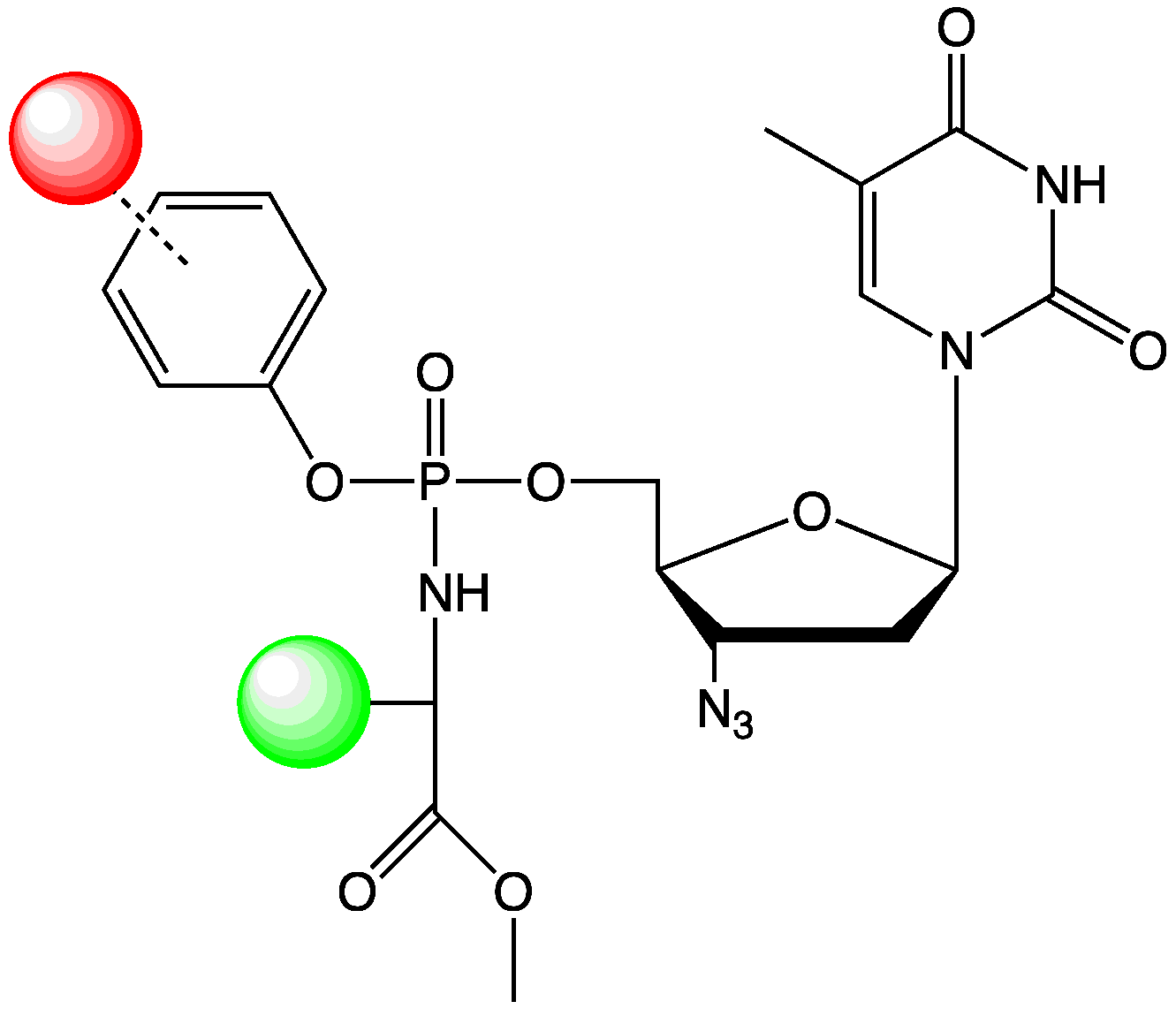
AZT protide

Subsequently, a series of aryloxy phosphoramidates of AZT were prepared with various p-aryl substituents and several amino acids. These compounds were studied exclusively in the AZT-resistant JM cell line to explore potential (implied) AZT-monophosphate release, with the alanine phosphoramidate proving to be exceptionally effective. In all HIV-1 infected JM cultures, AZT was inhibited at a concentration of 100μM, while the phenyl methoxy alaninyl phosphoramidate was active at 0.8μM. This was taken as the first evidence of a successful nucleotide delivery. It was also noted that in other series, there was a marked preference for alanine over leucine (10-fold) and glycine (>100-fold). Furthermore, although electron-withdrawing aryl substitution had proven highly effective in diaryl systems, it was detrimental in this context. Para fluoro substitution had a slight adventitious effect, but not significantly so, while para-nitro substitution led to a 100-fold loss of activity. In a subsequent study, the range of aryl substituents was expanded, and compounds were tested in both TK+ (thymidine kinase competent) and TK- (thymidine kinase deficient) cell lines. None of the phosphoramidates retained the high (2–4 nM) potency of AZT in TK-competent cell lines (CEM and MT-4) against either HIV-1 or HIV-2. However, while AZT lost all of its activity in the TK- deficient cell line CEM/TK-, most of the phosphoramidates retained antiviral activity, thus being ca >10–35-fold more active than AZT in this assay. Again, alanine emerged as an important component, with the glycine analogue being inactive in HIV-infected CEM/TK- all cultures. In this assay, leucine and phenylalanine were as effective as alanine, although they were less so in CEM/TK+ assays. Thus, the parent phenyl methoxy alanyl phosphoramidate emerged as an important lead compound.

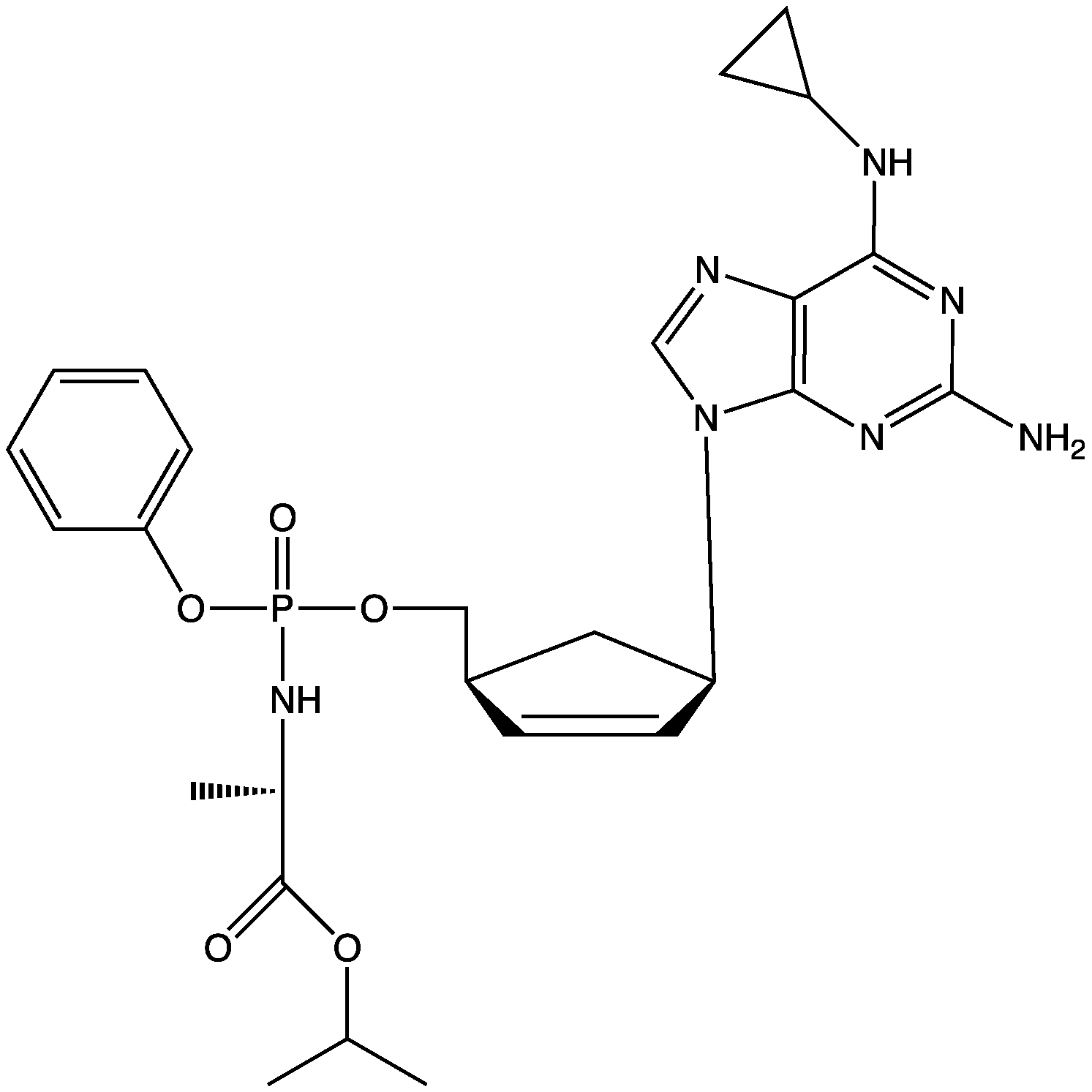
Phenyl isoproyl Ala Abacavir monophosphate

Stavudine (d4T) was an early application of the ProTide approach. This was a rational choice based on the known kinetics of phosphorylation of d4T. Thus, while the second phosphorylation (AZT-monophosphate to AZT-diphosphate) but not the first phosphorylation (AZT to AZT-monophosphate) is regarded as rate limiting for AZT activation to the triphosphate, the first step (d4T to d4T monophosphate) is thought in general to be the slow step for d4T. Thus, an intracellular (mono)nucleotide delivery should have a maximal impact for d4T and similar nucleosides. In the first instance (halo)alkyloxy phosphoramidates of d4T were prepared and found to retain activity in d4T-resistant JM cells. The activity was dependent on the haloalkyl group; the parent propyl system was poorly active. Subsequent studies in HIV-infected CEM/TK- cell cultures revealed the aryloxy phosphoramidates of d4T to be highly effective and, notably, to retain their full activity in CEM/TK- cells. In this study the benzyl ester emerged as slightly more potent than the parent methyl compound, being almost 10-times more active than d4T in CEM/TK+ assays and thus ca 300-500 fold more active than d4T, in CEM/TK- assays.

== Current applications ==
The ProTide pro-drugs are useful for delivering phosphonate containing drugs to cell types with high expression of CTSA and CES1, such as immune cells. Tenofovir alafenamide is a successful example of this iteration. ProTides are also useful for nucleoside analogues that do not get phosphorylated efficiently by endogenous nucleoside kinases. For the nucleoside GS-334750, the parent of sofosbuvir, phosphorylation by nucleoside kinases is effectively nilled, and the only way to deliver active nucleotide is through ProTide. A major limitation of ProTides is that they require an expression of esterases like CTSA and CES1, which is very high in some cell types like hepatocytes and plays to an advantage for the treatment of Hepatitis C of Sofosbuvir.

Sofosbuvir

Extensive studies followed on these promising d4T derivatives and the ProTide technology was successfully applied to a wide range of nucleoside analogues. In particular, the ProTide approach has been used on several clinically evaluated anti-HCV nucleoside analogues, including the 2013 FDA approved compound sofosbuvir, and the 2016 FDA approved compound, Tenofovir alafenamide. Remdesivir also uses the ProTide prodrug technology (self-immolation is the key principle of ProTide nucleotide prodrugs). Because GS-441524 nucleoside can be phosphorylated and activated, some researchers have argued that the Protide application is an unnecessary complication in Remdesivir's design and that the parent nucleoside would be a cheaper and more effective COVID-19 drug.

ProTides have been tested to deliver key phosphorylated metabolites in inborn errors of metabolism, such as phosphopantothenate for PANK2 deficiency, however these were a clinical failure.
