= Filibuvir =

Chemical compound

Clinical data
- Other names: PF-00868554
- Routes of administration: Oral
- ATC code: none

Legal status
- Legal status: Development terminated

Identifiers
- IUPAC name: (2R)-2-cyclopentyl-2-[2-(2,6-diethylpyridin-4-yl)ethyl]-5-[(5,7-dimethyl-[1,2,4]triazolo[1,5-a]pyrimidin-2-yl)methyl]-4-hydroxy-3H-pyran-6-one
- CAS Number: 877130-28-4
- PubChem CID: 54708673
- ChemSpider: 26286922
- UNII: 198J479Y2L
- KEGG: D09616
- ChEMBL: ChEMBL490672
- PDB ligand: AG0 (PDBe, RCSB PDB)
- CompTox Dashboard (EPA): DTXSID601007768

Chemical and physical data
- Formula: C_{29}H_{37}N_{5}O_{3}
- Molar mass: 503.647 g·mol^{−1}
- 3D model (JSmol): Interactive image
- SMILES: CCC1=CC(=CC(=N1)CC)CC[C@@]2(CC(=C(C(=O)O2)CC3=NN4C(=CC(=NC4=N3)C)C)O)C5CCCC5
- InChI: InChI=1S/C29H37N5O3/c1-5-22-14-20(15-23(6-2)31-22)11-12-29(21-9-7-8-10-21)17-25(35)24(27(36)37-29)16-26-32-28-30-18(3)13-19(4)34(28)33-26/h13-15,21,35H,5-12,16-17H2,1-4H3/t29-/m1/s1; Key:SLVAPEZTBDBAPI-GDLZYMKVSA-N

Filibuvir (also known as PF-00868554, PF-868554) was a non-nucleoside orally available NS5B inhibitor developed by Pfizer for the treatment of hepatitis C. It binds to the non-catalytic Thumb II allosteric pocket of NS5B viral polymerase and causes a decrease in viral RNA synthesis. It is a potent and selective inhibitor, with a mean IC50 of 0.019 μM against genotype 1 polymerases. Several filibuvir-resistant mutations have been identified, M423 being the most common that occurred after filibuvir monotherapy. It was intended to be taken twice-daily.

Its investigation was discontinued in February 2013 due to strategic reasons.
