= Setrobuvir =

Chemical compound

Names
- Preferred IUPAC name N-(3-{(4aR,5S,8R,8aS)-1-[(4-Fluorophenyl)methyl]-4-hydroxy-2-oxo-1,2,4a,5,6,7,8,8a-octahydro-5,8-methanoquinolin-3-yl}-1,1-dioxo-1,4-dihydro-1λ^{6},2,4-benzothiadiazin-7-yl)methanesulfonamide
- Other names ANA-598; ANA598

Identifiers
CAS Number	1071517-39-9
3D model (JSmol)	Interactive image
ChEMBL	ChEMBL1076263
ChemSpider	24680206
KEGG	D10165
PubChem CID	45136829
UNII	T5B2GI8F84
CompTox Dashboard (EPA)	DTXSID301029850
- InChI: InChI=1S/C25H25FN4O6S2/c1-37(33,34)28-17-8-9-18-19(11-17)38(35,36)29-24(27-18)21-23(31)20-14-4-5-15(10-14)22(20)30(25(21)32)12-13-2-6-16(26)7-3-13/h2-3,6-9,11,14-15,20,22,28,31H,4-5,10,12H2,1H3,(H,27,29)/t14-,15+,20+,22-/m0/s1 Key: DEKOYVOWOVJMPM-RLHIPHHXSA-N; InChI=1/C25H25FN4O6S2/c1-37(33,34)28-17-8-9-18-19(11-17)38(35,36)29-24(27-18)21-23(31)20-14-4-5-15(10-14)22(20)30(25(21)32)12-13-2-6-16(26)7-3-13/h2-3,6-9,11,14-15,20,22,28,31H,4-5,10,12H2,1H3,(H,27,29)/t14-,15+,20+,22-/m0/s1 Key: DEKOYVOWOVJMPM-RLHIPHHXBY
- SMILES: CS(NC(C=C1)=CC2=C1NC(C3=C(O)[C@@]4([H])[C@@]([C@@H]5CC[C@H]4C5)([H])N(CC6=CC=C(F)C=C6)C3=O)=NS2(=O)=O)(=O)=O

Properties
Chemical formula	C_{25}H_{25}FN_{4}O_{6}S_{2}
Molar mass	560.62 g·mol^{−1}
- Except where otherwise noted, data are given for materials in their standard state (at 25 °C [77 °F], 100 kPa). verify (what is ?) Infobox references

Setrobuvir (also known as ANA-598) was an experimental drug candidate for the treatment of hepatitis C that was discovered at Anadys Pharmaceuticals, which was acquired by Roche in 2011; Roche terminated development in July 2015. It was in Phase IIb clinical trials, used in combination with interferon and ribavirin, targeting hepatitis C patients with genotype 1.

Setrobuvir works by inhibiting the hepatitis C enzyme NS5B, an RNA polymerase.
