= Radalbuvir =

Chemical compound

Clinical data
- Other names: GS-9669

Legal status
- Legal status: US: Investigational New Drug

Identifiers
- IUPAC name: 5-(3,3-Dimethylbut-1-yn-1-yl)-3-{(1R)-N-[(1s,4s)-4-hydroxy-4-({[(3S)-oxolan-3-yl]oxy}methyl)cyclohexyl]-4-methylcyclohex-3-ene-1-carboxamido}thiophene-2-carboxylic acid
- CAS Number: 1314795-11-3
- PubChem CID: 53259022
- ChemSpider: 31140180
- UNII: 273K4V0SPC

Chemical and physical data
- Formula: C_{30}H_{41}NO_{6}S
- Molar mass: 543.72 g·mol^{−1}
- 3D model (JSmol): Interactive image
- SMILES: CC1=CC[C@@H](CC1)C(=O)N([C@H]2CC[C@](CC2)(O)CO[C@@H]3COCC3)c4c(sc(c4)C#CC(C)(C)C)C(=O)O
- InChI: InChI=1S/C30H41NO6S/c1-20-5-7-21(8-6-20)27(32)31(25-17-24(11-13-29(2,3)4)38-26(25)28(33)34)22-9-14-30(35,15-10-22)19-37-23-12-16-36-18-23/h5,17,21-23,35H,6-10,12,14-16,18-19H2,1-4H3,(H,33,34)/t21-,22-,23-,30+/m0/s1; Key:MUICUPWICXUNRS-GDCCIXDYSA-N

Radalbuvir (INN, also known as GS-9669) is an experimental antiviral drug for the treatment of hepatitis C virus (HCV) infection developed by Gilead Sciences. Radalbuvir acts as an NS5B inhibitor. It is currently in clinical trials. It targets NS5B polymerase.
