= Hepatitis C treatment in Moldova =

Hepatitis C treatment is a complex and long-lasting process, in which antiviral medications are used to treat the infection. Along with the medication, the treatment period includes a strict diet.

The wide spread of the hepatitis C in the Republic of Moldova during the period of 1990-1995 created an epidemiological situation in the country. The number of patients with chronic hepatitis C in 1990 was 39,552, while in 1995 it was 53,862. The mortality rate caused by the hepatitis C virus and virus-induced cirrhosis increased significantly from 2,973 in 1990 to 3,848 in 1995.

== National Program, 1997 ==
The epidemiological situation has created the premise of the urgent fight against the viral hepatitis from both, a medical and economical point of view (the annual cost of the treatment was 54-55 million lei). The first national Program for the control of viral hepatitis was launched in July 1997. It included comprehensive measures of specific and nonspecific prophylaxis. The main objective of the nonspecific prophylaxis in the medical institutions was to eliminate the risk of transmission of the viral hepatitis C from patients to the medical staff, and others using the medical institutions’ services.

Nonspecific prophylaxis

The nonspecific prophylaxis included a rigorous selection of blood donors and other biological fluids as well as their extensive testing for the presence of hepatitis C virus. The sterilization of medical instruments in all hospitals and clinics became mandatory, and the unreasonable parenteral manipulation in medical institutions was reduced to the minimum. In non-medical institutions, like beauty salons (spa, acupuncture, manicure, pedicure salons) nonspecific prophylaxis were carried out by ensuring the sterilization of the working tools. Within the rest of the society a nonspecific prophylaxis was performed by ensuring the individual use of shaving devices, toothbrushes and other elements that may affect the integrity of the skin and mucous membranes.

Social Mobilization

The main task of social mobilization campaign was to inform the population, especially the risk groups, about the epidemiological situation and the serious consequences of the disease on these infections, about the effectiveness of specific and non-specific preventive measures to increase the responsibility of medical staff. To successfully implement the social mobilization, the following activities were carried out:

- informative and educational materials (brochures, booklets, posters) were published;
- publication of press articles at national and local level;
- radio and TV shows were organized;
- republican scientific and practical conferences, regional and national seminars were organized;
- systematic conversations of health workers with the population, particularly with risk groups;
- the process of social mobilization involved the experience of other states, of non-governmental organizations and scientific societies.

== National Program, 2007-2011 ==
As a result of the implementation of specific and non-specific preventive measures provided by the National Program for Combating Viral Hepatitis B, C and D for the years 1997–2006, the situation in the country has improved significantly. The incidence of VHC decreased from 266 cases in 1997 to 127 cases in 2005. According to available statistics, annually in Moldova were identified approximatively 2.700 carriers of hepatitis C virus and 7.000 people with chronic hepatitis and hepatic cirrhosis. As a result of these complications, approximately 3.000 people in the republic died annually. Due to the implementation of preventive measures within the National Control Program of Hepatitis B, C and D, it was possible to stabilize the incident rates of chronic hepatitis and cirrhosis in children. Thus in 2004, as compared with 2003, the incidence of these diseases among children aged 0–17 years decreased from 99.5% (909) cases to 66.1% (559 cases).

The prevalence of liver cirrhosis in the Republic of Moldova in 2009 increased by 18.1% compared to 2005 (1922.4 cases per 100.000 inhabitants and 1628.1 cases per 100.000 respectively). This phenomenon has a growth tendency at the municipal level (from 1126,3 cases per 100,000 inhabitants in 2005 to 1358,2 cases per 100,000 inhabitants in 2009) and at district level (from 1802,7 cases per 100.000 inhabitants in 2005 to 2103,4 cases per 100.000 inhabitants in 2009).

According to the retrospective epidemiological analysis of the incidence of acute viral hepatitis in Chisinau during 1992–2011, obtained in the study “Some epidemiological aspects of acute hepatitis B, C and D in Chișinău municipality”, the dynamics of the incidence of the acute viral parenteral hepatitis among the population of the municipality had a downward trend during that time.

The goal of the 2007-2011 Program was to further reduce the incidence of acute and chronic viral hepatitis as well as the mortality in most of the European Community countries. As part of the national program, patients with viral hepatitis C were subject to complete screening and all necessary tests. The need for these procedures was to determine the patients who needed the most urgent medical attention. They were first included in the program.

Patients received free medication against the viral hepatitis C, were observed by doctors during the treatment. Monitoring played an important role – thus it was possible the monitoring and recording of results and the effectiveness of the treatment. As a rule, in the first week patients passed a blood count test, in week 4 – a biochemical blood test, and in week 12 their viral load was checked.

== National Program, 2012-2016 ==
The Ministry of Health launched the national campaign for treatment of the viral hepatitis B, C and D. The medications, purchased for this purpose, were distributed in most of the country's administrative-territorial units, for apportioning them among the patients included in the treatment of the program. At the time of the approval of the third national program, Republic of Moldova was qualified as a zone with medium endemicity. However, with regards to the number of deaths from viral hepatitis, Moldova ranks first in Europe. In this respect, the objectives of the third program were:

- to decrease the incidence of acute hepatitis B by 2016 to 2 cases per 100,000 inhabitants;
- to decrease the incidence of acute hepatitis C by 2016 to 2 cases per 100,000 inhabitants;
- to decrease the incidence of acute hepatitis D by 2016 to 0.2 cases per 100,000 inhabitants;
- the annual provision of antiviral treatment for adult patients and children with chronic viral hepatitis and liver cirrhosis due to hepatitis B, C and D in at least 300 patients with viral hepatitis B, 300 with viral hepatitis C and 100 with viral hepatitis D.

In 2016, Ministry of Health in Moldova increased the quota-free-treatment by seven times . New antiviral drugs were purchased for the National Program, from Egypt and Bangladesh. The medications arrived in the medical institutions as well as in the pharmacies in the country. Their efficiency reached 98%. Such drugs were used for the first time in Moldova in 2016. During the course of this program, more than five thousand people received treatment, only in a few cases the treatment did not have the expected success.

=== The expected results of the National Program, 2012-2016 ===
- decrease of endemicity in the Republic of Moldova below the medium level (the frequency of the detection of hepatitis C varies between 2-5%, the lifetime risk of the infection will be 20-30% for all population groups.
- significant decrease of the incidence of viral hepatitis C – from 2,24 to 1,5-1,8 per 100.000 inhabitants;
- decrease of the incidence of chronic viral hepatitis, with a 15% detection decrease (from approximately 99.7 to 85 cases per 100,000 inhabitants);
- significant decrease in mortality and disability due to chronic viral hepatitis and liver cancer;
- a 10% reduction in the level of simultaneous infection with viral hepatitis B and C in HIV-infected people.

== National Program, 2017-2021 ==
At the end of the 2012-2016 National Program, Hepatitis C still posed a serious problem. In this respect, it was decided to approve the national program for the period of 2017–2021. According to statistics the incidence rate in the Republic of Moldova decreased in 2015. The incidence of chronic viral hepatitis was high with a tendency of growth, which consisted of 43,282 patients with chronic viral hepatitis: chronic viral hepatitis B- 25,961 patients, chronic hepatitis C – 13,423 patients, chronic hepatitis D – 1,481 patients, unspecified hepatitis – 2,417 patients. Also, the cases of liver cirrhosis of viral etiology increased – 5,178 patients. According to the data of international organizations, Republic of Moldova ranks first in the world in terms of cirrhosis mortality – 71.2 deaths per 100,000 inhabitants. The main objective of the Program is to further reduce the incidence of acute chronic viral hepatitis B, C and D and cirrhosis, by minimizing the socio-economic consequences. The specific objectives of the program include:

1. developing services for diagnosis and lab screening of viral hepatitis B, C and D with the increase of early detection of those infected with these viruses by 2021;
2. 50% decrease of the incidence and prevalence of acute viral hepatitis B, C and D, to reduce by 50% the incidence of chronic hepatitis and cirrhosis caused by these viruses by 2021;
3. by 2021, to ensure that at least 50% of patients with viral hepatitis B, C and D in the Republic of Moldova have access to permanent care services, based on the implementation of national clinical protocols;
4. provide continuous information until 2021, by increasing the degree of alertness of each person, especially in the risk groups and the community related to the viral hepatitis B, C and D;
5. conducting scientific and practical researches on viral hepatitis B, C and D between 2017 and 2021, with improved control and response measures to reduce the risk of transmission

The action plan for implementation of the National Program includes:

- provision of zonal labs with diagnostic tests to determine viral hepatitis markers;
- purchase of Fibroscan devices;
- development and implementation of the Automatic Information System of the Hepatitis Registry;
- information and communication campaigns;
- measures to promote health (awareness), fight the viral hepatitis B, C and D, carried out by specialists in the field

The implementation of this program is monitored by the Ministry of Health in collaboration with the National Public Health Center, the territorial health centers, National Center for Health Management, public health institutions, the Nicolae Testemițanu State University of Medicine and Pharmacy and the Academy of Sciences of Moldova.
