= Ledipasvir/sofosbuvir =

Medication used to treat hepatitis C

Combination of
- Ledipasvir: NS5A inhibitor
- Sofosbuvir: NS5B (RNA polymerase) inhibitor

Clinical data
- Trade names: Harvoni, Hepcinat-LP, others
- AHFS/Drugs.com: Monograph
- MedlinePlus: a614051
- License data: EU EMA: by INN; US DailyMed: Harvoni
- Pregnancy category: AU: B1
- Routes of administration: By mouth
- ATC code: J05AP51 (WHO)

Legal status
- Legal status: AU: S4 (Prescription only); CA: ℞-only; UK: POM (Prescription only); US: ℞-only; EU: Rx-only

Identifiers
- PubChem CID: 72734365
- KEGG: D10578
- ChEBI: CHEBI:85082

Chemical and physical data
- Formula: C_{71}H_{83}F_{3}N_{11}O_{15}P
- Molar mass: 1418.476 g·mol^{−1}
- 3D model (JSmol): Interactive image
- SMILES: CC(C)C(C(=O)N1CC2(CC2)CC1C3=NC=C(N3)C4=CC5=C(C=C4)C6=C(C5(F)F)C=C(C=C6)C7=CC8=C(C=C7)N=C(N8)C9C1CCC(C1)N9C(=O)C(C(C)C)NC(=O)OC)NC(=O)OC.CC(C)OC(=O)C(C)NP(=O)(OCC1C(C(C(O1)N2C=CC(=O)NC2=O)(C)F)O)OC3=CC=CC=C3
- InChI: InChI=1S/C49H54F2N8O6.C22H29FN3O9P/c1-24(2)39(56-46(62)64-5)44(60)58-23-48(15-16-48)21-38(58)42-52-22-37(55-42)28-9-13-32-31-12-8-26(18-33(31)49(50,51)34(32)19-28)27-10-14-35-36(20-27)54-43(53-35)41-29-7-11-30(17-29)59(41)45(61)40(25(3)4)57-47(63)65-6;1-13(2)33-19(29)14(3)25-36(31,35-15-8-6-5-7-9-15)32-12-16-18(28)22(4,23)20(34-16)26-11-10-17(27)24-21(26)30/h8-10,12-14,18-20,22,24-25,29-30,38-41H,7,11,15-17,21,23H2,1-6H3,(H,52,55)(H,53,54)(H,56,62)(H,57,63);5-11,13-14,16,18,20,28H,12H2,1-4H3,(H,25,31)(H,24,27,30)/t29-,30+,38-,39-,40-,41-;14-,16+,18+,20+,22+,36+/m00/s1; Key:YWRYBUCQWKGONV-CABNZSRHSA-N

Ledipasvir/sofosbuvir, sold under the trade name Harvoni among others, is a medication used to treat hepatitis C. It is a fixed-dose combination of ledipasvir and sofosbuvir. Cure rates are 94% to 99% in people infected with hepatitis C virus (HCV) genotype 1. Some evidence also supports use in HCV genotype 3 and 4. It is taken daily by mouth for 8–24 weeks.

It is generally well tolerated. Common side effects include muscle pains, headache, nausea, rash, and cough. It is unclear if use in pregnancy is safe for the baby. Ledipasvir works by decreasing the activity of NS5A and sofosbuvir works by decreasing the activity of NS5B polymerase.

Ledipasvir/sofosbuvir was approved for medical use in the United States, in the European Union, and in Canada in 2014. It is on the World Health Organization's List of Essential Medicines.

== Medical uses ==
Cure rates are 94% to 99% in people infected with genotype 1 (46% of HCV cases). It has also been evaluated for the treatment of infection with other hepatitis C genotypes, and has shown promising results in genotypes 3 and 4 (making up 30% and less than 22% of HCV cases respectively).

=== Resistance ===
==== NS5A mutations ====
Multiple mutations of HCV replicons are necessary to cause a significant effect in resistance due to multiple mechanisms of action. In general, HCV genotype 1a is less resistant to mutation than genotype 1b.

For genotype 1b a single amino acid substitution (e.g. L31V) in the replicon had less than a 100 fold increase in resistance to the ledipasvir in Harvoni, while a two amino acid substitution had over a 1000 fold increase in resistance. Genotype 1a had a similar but more substantial increase in resistance with each respective increase in amino acid substitution with resistance associated substitutions at K24R, M28T/V, Q30R/H/K/L, L31M, and or Y93H/N.

NS5A polymorphisms also have an effect on viral resistance with the most common resistance-associated amino acid substitutions detected at Q30R, Y93H or N, and L31M in patients with a rapid virological response (RVR). The specific baseline NS5A resistance-associated polymorphisms observed in clinical trials were M28T/V, Q30H, Q30R, L31M, H58P, Y93H, and Y93N in genotype 1a and L28M, A92T, and Y93H in genotype 1b. Patients with multiple baseline NS5A polymorphisms tend to have higher relapse rates when using ledipasvir/sofosbuvir. The difference in relapse rates between treatment naive and treatment experience groups with baseline NS5A polymorphisms ranges from 1% after a 12-week regimen and 0% after a 24-week regimen respectively.

==== NS5B mutations ====
A single amino acid substitution S282T contributes to viral resistance and decreases the activity of sofosbuvir in ledipasvir/sofosbuvir by approximately 2 to 18 fold.

==== Cross resistance ====
No cross resistance was seen in the combination of ledipasvir and sofosbuvir in ION phase 1,2 and, 3 clinical trials as ledipasvir was fully active against sofosbuvir-resistance-associated substitutions and vice versa.

== Side effects ==
More than 10% of people taking ledipasvir/sofosbuvir have headaches or fatigue; rashes, nausea, diarrhea, and insomnia occur in between 1% and 10% of people taking it.

More severe reactions are connected with allergic reactions to the medications and cardiovascular problems. Harvoni side effects are considered relatively mild compared to older interferon-based treatment.

Ledipasvir/sofosbuvir could cause hepatitis B re-activation in people co-infected with hepatitis B and C viruses. The European Medicines Agency recommended screening all people for hepatitis B before starting ledipasvir/sofosbuvir for hepatitis C in order to minimize the risk of hepatitis B reactivation.

== Drug interactions ==
Ledipasvir/sofosbuvir is a substrate for the drug transporters P-glycoprotein (P-gp) and breast cancer resistance protein (BCRP). Intestinal absorption of these drug transporter substrates may be decreased by inducers such as rifampin and St. John's wort.

Patients are also advised to stay away from H_{2} receptor antagonists (H2RA) and proton-pump inhibitors (PPI) because they decrease the concentration of ledipasvir (its solubility is pH-dependent and is higher under acidic conditions). Therefore, it is advised to take a PPI at least two hours after ledipasvir/sofosbuvir with a dose less than or equal to 20 mg daily and H2RAs with a dose of less than or equal to 40 mg twice daily.

Ledipasvir/sofosbuvir should additionally be avoided when taking amiodarone or other drugs that lower heart rate; there is a serious risk of the heart slowing or stopping when ledipasvir/sofosbuvir is used with such drugs.

== Mechanisms of action ==
The most commonly associated mechanism associated with ledipasvir/sofosbuvir is the hyperphosphorylation of NS5A, a viral polymerase important in proper viral assembly and interferes with proper liver metabolism. Ledipasvir/sofosbuvir inhibits the proper viral assembly by re-positioning NS5A's sub-cellular localization.

NS5B, a viral polymerase that can initiate RNA synthesis de novo, is also allosterically inhibited by ledipasvir/sofosbuvir.

NS5A and NS5B inhibitors in combination have a synergistic effect.

== Pharmacokinetics ==
Sofosbuvir is absorbed fast in the plasma with a peak concentration (Cmax) at 0.8 to 1 hour after the administered dosage and undergoes extra hepatic metabolism with 61 to 65% bound to human plasma proteins. It is then predominantly converted to the inactive phosphate free circulating metabolite GS-331007 (eliminated 76% through renal passive filtration) which has a median peak plasma concentration at 3.5 to 4 hours after the medication is ingested. Sofosbuvir does not appear to be affected by different levels of macronutrients when compared with fasting states.

Ledipasvir has a maximum concentration at 4 to 4.5 hours after ingestion and is not affected by macronutrients. It is more than 98% protein bound and is predominantly eliminated fecally, with minimal metabolism in the liver.

=== Elimination ===
The median terminal half life after a dosage of ledipasvir/sofosbuvir for 90 mg of [14C]-Ledipasvir is 47 hours; for 400 mg of [14C]-Sofosbuvir it is 0.5 hours (after the initial distribution of medication in body tissue) and 27 hours (the eventual excretion of the medication).

Steady State (Cmax)
Substance	ng/mL
Ledipasvir	323
Sofosbuvir	618
GS-331007	707

Note: The maximum concentration is 32% higher in healthy individuals than those infected with Hepatitis C.

Mean Steady State AUC0-24 (Area Under the Curve During 24 hours)
Substance	ng*hr/mL
Ledipasvir	7290
Sofosbuvir	1320
GS-33107	12,000

Note: The maximum concentration is 24% higher in healthy individuals than those infected with Hepatitis C.

=== Blood detection ===
An analytical method based on LC tandem MS has been developed for the simultaneous extraction and determination of ledipasvir/sofosbuvir in human plasma using antiviral daclatasvir as an internal standard. Average extraction recoveries for sofosbuvir and ledipasvir were 91.61% and 88.93% respectively.

== Society and culture ==
One manufacturer is Gilead Sciences.
