= Ledipasvir =

Hepatitis C drug

Clinical data
- Trade names: Harvoni (combination with sofosbuvir)
- Other names: GS-5885
- License data: EU EMA: by INN
- Routes of administration: By mouth
- ATC code: J05AP51 (WHO) (combination with sofosbuvir)

Legal status
- Legal status: US: ℞-only

Pharmacokinetic data
- Bioavailability: 76%
- Protein binding: >99%
- Metabolism: No cytochrome metabolism
- Elimination half-life: 47 hrs

Identifiers
- IUPAC name: Methyl N-[(2S)-1-[(6S)-6-[5-[9,9-Difluoro-7-[2-[(1S,2S,4R)-3-[(2S)-2-(methoxycarbonylamino)-3-methylbutanoyl]-3-azabicyclo[2.2.1]heptan-2-yl]-3H-benzimidazol-5-yl]fluoren-2-yl]-1H-imidazol-2-yl]-5-azaspiro[2.4]heptan-5-yl]-3-methyl-1-oxobutan-2-yl]carbamate
- CAS Number: 1256388-51-8
- PubChem CID: 67505836
- DrugBank: DB09027
- ChemSpider: 29271894
- UNII: 013TE6E4WV
- KEGG: D10442
- ChEBI: CHEBI:85089
- CompTox Dashboard (EPA): DTXSID90154829

Chemical and physical data
- Formula: C_{49}H_{54}F_{2}N_{8}O_{6}
- Molar mass: 889.018 g·mol^{−1}
- 3D model (JSmol): Interactive image
- SMILES: COC(=O)N[C@H](C(=O)N1CC2(CC2)C[C@H]1c1ncc(-c2ccc3c(c2)C(F)(F)c2cc(-c4ccc5nc([C@@H]6[C@H]7CC[C@H](C7)N6C(=O)[C@@H](NC(=O)OC)C(C)C)[nH]c5c4)ccc2-3)[nH]1)C(C)C
- InChI: InChI=1S/C49H54F2N8O6/c1-24(2)39(56-46(62)64-5)44(60)58-23-48(15-16-48)21-38(58)42-52-22-37(55-42)28-9-13-32-31-12-8-26(18-33(31)49(50,51)34(32)19-28)27-10-14-35-36(20-27)54-43(53-35)41-29-7-11-30(17-29)59(41)45(61)40(25(3)4)57-47(63)65-6/h8-10,12-14,18-20,22,24-25,29-30,38-41H,7,11,15-17,21,23H2,1-6H3,(H,52,55)(H,53,54)(H,56,62)(H,57,63)/t29-,30+,38-,39-,40-,41-/m0/s1; Key:VRTWBAAJJOHBQU-KMWAZVGDSA-N

Ledipasvir is a drug for the treatment of hepatitis C that was developed by Gilead Sciences. After completing Phase III clinical trials, on February 10, 2014, Gilead filed for U.S. approval of a ledipasvir/sofosbuvir fixed-dose combination tablet for genotype 1 hepatitis C. The ledipasvir/sofosbuvir combination is a direct-acting antiviral agent that interferes with HCV replication and can be used to treat patients with genotypes 1a or 1b without PEG-interferon or ribavirin.

Ledipasvir is an inhibitor of NS5A, a hepatitis C virus protein.

Data presented at the 20th Conference on Retroviruses and Opportunistic Infections in March 2013 showed that a triple regimen of the nucleotide analog inhibitor sofosbuvir, ledipasvir, and ribavirin produced a 12-week post-treatment sustained virological response (SVR12) rate of 100% for both treatment-naive patients and prior non-responders with HCV genotype 1. The sofosbuvir/ledipasvir coformulation is being tested with and without ribavirin. In February 2014 Gilead filed for United States Food and Drug Administration (FDA) approval of ledipasvir/sofosbuvir oral treatment, without interferon and ribavirin.

On 10 October 2014 the FDA approved the combination product ledipasvir/sofosbuvir called Harvoni.

== Medical uses ==
Ledipasvir is most commonly used in combination with sofosbuvir for treatment in chronic hepatitis C genotype 1 patients. This drug has been tested and shown efficacy in treatment-naive and treatment experienced patients.

== Adverse effects ==
According to clinical trials, ledipasvir/sofosbuvir has been very well tolerated with the most common side effects being fatigue and headache.

== Interactions ==
Most drug-drug interactions with Harvoni involve Pgp-inducers such as St. John’s wort or rifampicin. Concomitant use will decrease the blood concentration of Harvoni and thus, have reduced therapeutic effects.

== Mechanism of action ==
Ledipasvir inhibits an important viral phosphoprotein, NS5A, which is involved in viral replication, assembly, and secretion.

Sofosbuvir, on the other hand, is metabolized to a uridine triphosphate mimic, which acts as a RNA chain terminator when incorporated into RNA by NS5B polymerase.

== Cost ==
Similar to sofosbuvir, the cost of Harvoni has been a controversial topic. It costs $1,125 per pill in the US, translating to $63,000 for an 8-week treatment course, $94,500 for a 12-week treatment course, or $189,000 for a 24-week treatment course. Gilead justifies the cost by outweighing the benefit of curing hepatitis C over the cost of spending double on liver transplants or temporarily treating liver diseases. Gilead has provided a ledipasvir/sofosbuvir assistance program for eligible underserved or underinsured hepatitis C patients who cannot afford the costs of treatment.

In July 2015 Gilead modified the eligibility criteria to receive Support Path benefits for HCV patients in the United States.

== See also ==
- Discovery and development of NS5A inhibitors
