= Sofosbuvir =

Chemical compound

Clinical data
- Trade names: Sovaldi, others
- Other names: PSI-7977; GS-7977
- AHFS/Drugs.com: Monograph
- MedlinePlus: a614014
- License data: EU EMA: by INN; US DailyMed: Sofosbuvir; US FDA: Sofosbuvir
- Pregnancy category: AU: B1
- Routes of administration: By mouth
- Drug class: HCV polymerase inhibitor
- ATC code: J05AP08 (WHO) J05AP51 (WHO) J05AP55 (WHO) J05AP56 (WHO)

Legal status
- Legal status: AU: S4 (Prescription only); UK: POM (Prescription only); US: ℞-only; EU: Rx-only

Pharmacokinetic data
- Bioavailability: 92%
- Protein binding: 61–65%
- Metabolism: Quickly activated to triphosphate (CatA/CES1, HIST1, phosphorylation)
- Elimination half-life: 0.4 hrs (sofosbuvir); 27 hrs (inactive metabolite GS-331007)
- Excretion: 80% urine, 14% feces (mostly as GS-331007)

Identifiers
- IUPAC name: Isopropyl (2S)-2-[[[(2R,3R,4R,5R)-5-(2,4-dioxopyrimidin-1-yl)-4-fluoro-3-hydroxy-4-methyl-tetrahydrofuran-2-yl]methoxy-phenoxy-phosphoryl]amino]propanoate
- CAS Number: 1190307-88-0
- PubChem CID: 45375808
- IUPHAR/BPS: 7368
- DrugBank: DB08934
- ChemSpider: 26286922
- UNII: WJ6CA3ZU8B
- KEGG: D10366
- ChEBI: CHEBI:85083
- ChEMBL: ChEMBL1259059
- CompTox Dashboard (EPA): DTXSID701027632
- ECHA InfoCard: 100.224.393

Chemical and physical data
- Formula: C_{22}H_{29}FN_{3}O_{9}P
- Molar mass: 529.458 g·mol^{−1}
- 3D model (JSmol): Interactive image
- SMILES: C[C@@H](C(=O)OC(C)C)N[P@](=O)(OC[C@@H]1[C@H]([C@@]([C@@H](O1)N2C=CC(=O)NC2=O)(C)F)O)OC3=CC=CC=C3
- InChI: InChI=1S/C22H29FN3O9P/c1-13(2)33-19(29)14(3)25-36(31,35-15-8-6-5-7-9-15)32-12-16-18(28)22(4,23)20(34-16)26-11-10-17(27)24-21(26)30/h5-11,13-14,16,18,20,28H,12H2,1-4H3,(H,25,31)(H,24,27,30)/t14-,16+,18+,20+,22+,36-/m0/s1; Key:TTZHDVOVKQGIBA-IQWMDFIBSA-N

Sofosbuvir, sold under the brand name Sovaldi among others, is a medication used to treat hepatitis C. It is taken by mouth.

Common side effects include fatigue, headache, nausea, and trouble sleeping. Side effects are generally more common in interferon-containing regimens. Sofosbuvir may reactivate hepatitis B in those who have been previously infected. In combination with ledipasvir, daclatasvir or simeprevir, it is not recommended with amiodarone due to the risk of an abnormally slow heartbeat. Sofosbuvir is in the nucleotide analog family of medications and works by blocking the hepatitis C NS5B protein.

Sofosbuvir was discovered in 2007 and approved for medical use in the United States in 2013. It is on the World Health Organization's List of Essential Medicines.

== Medical uses ==
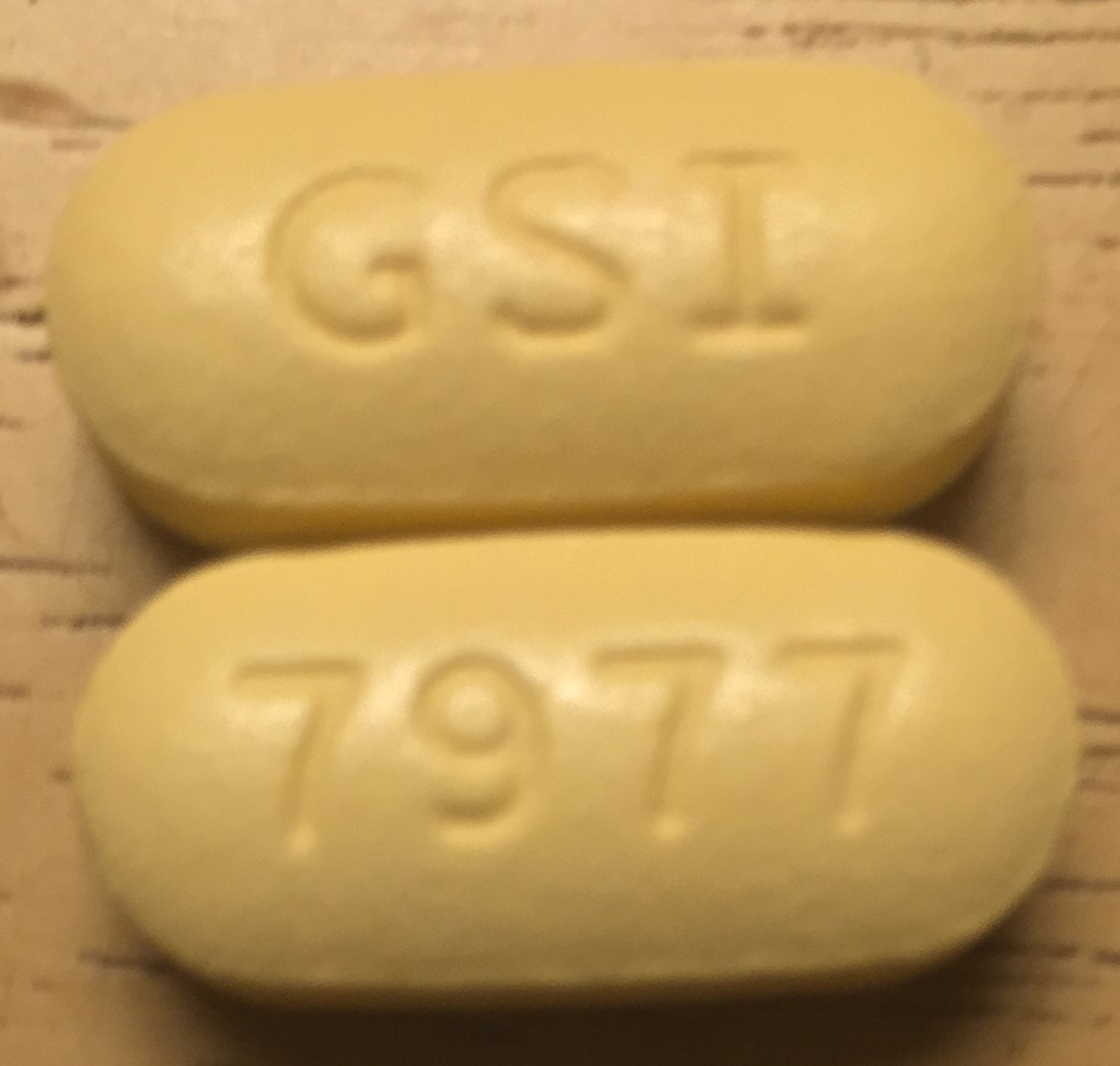
Sofosbuvir (Sovaldi) 400mg

=== Initial HCV treatment ===
In 2016, the American Association for the Study of Liver Diseases and the Infectious Diseases Society of America jointly published a recommendation for the management of hepatitis C. In this recommendation, sofosbuvir used in combination with other drugs is part of all first-line treatments for HCV genotypes 1, 2, 3, 4, 5, and 6, and is also part of some second-line treatments. Sofosbuvir in combination with velpatasvir is recommended for all genotypes with a cure rate greater than 90%, and close to 100% in most cases. The duration of treatment is typically 12 weeks.

Sofosbuvir is also used with other medications and longer treatment durations, depending on specific circumstances, genotype and cost-effectiveness–based perspective. For example, for the treatment of genotypes 1, 4, 5, and 6 hepatitis C infections, sofosbuvir can be used in combination with the viral NS5A inhibitor ledipasvir. In genotype 2 and 3 HCV infections, sofosbuvir can be used in combination with daclatasvir. For the treatment of cases with cirrhosis or liver transplant patients, weight-based ribavirin is sometimes added. Peginterferon with or without sofosbuvir is not recommended in an initial HCV treatment.

Compared to previous treatments, sofosbuvir-based regimens provide a higher cure rate, fewer side effects, and a two- to four-fold reduction in therapy duration. Sofosbuvir allows most people to be treated successfully without the use of peginterferon, an injectable drug with severe side effects that is a key component of older drug combinations for the treatment of hepatitis C virus.

=== Prior failed treatment ===
For people who have experienced treatment failure with some form of combination therapy for hepatitis C infection, one of the next possible steps would be retreatment with sofosbuvir and either ledipasvir or daclatasvir, with or without weight-based ribavirin. The genotype and particular combination therapy a person was on when the initial treatment failed are also taken into consideration when deciding which combination to use next. The duration of retreatment can range from 12 weeks to 24 weeks depending on several factors, including which medications are used for the retreatment, whether the person has liver cirrhosis or not, and whether the liver damage is classified as compensated cirrhosis or decompensated cirrhosis.

=== Pregnancy and breastfeeding ===
No adequate human data are available to establish whether or not sofosbuvir poses a risk to pregnancy outcomes. However, ribavirin, a medication that is often given together with sofosbuvir to treat hepatitis C, is assigned a Pregnancy Category X (contraindicated in pregnancy) by the FDA. Pregnant women with hepatitis C who take ribavirin have shown some cases of birth defects and death in their fetus. It is recommended that sofosbuvir/ribarivin combinations be avoided in pregnant females and their male sexual partners in order to reduce harmful fetal defects caused by ribavirin. Females who could potentially become pregnant should undergo a pregnancy test 2 months prior to starting the sofosbuvir/ribavirin/peginterferon combination treatment, monthly throughout the duration of the treatment, and six months post-treatment to reduce the risk of fetal harm in case of accidental pregnancy.

It is unknown whether sofosbuvir and ribavirin pass into breastmilk; therefore, it is recommended that the mother does not breastfeed during treatment with sofosbuvir alone or in combination with ribavirin.

== Contraindications ==
There are no specific contraindications for sofosbuvir when used alone. However, when used in combination with ribavirin or peginterferon alfa/ribavirin, or others, the contraindications applicable to these agents are applied.

== Side effects ==
Sofosbuvir used alone and in combination with other drugs such as ribavirin with or without a peginterferon has a good safety profile. Common side effects are fatigue, headache, nausea, rash, irritability, dizziness, back pain, and anemia. Most side effects are more common in interferon-containing regimens as compared to interferon-free regimens. For example, fatigue and headache are nearly reduced by half, influenza-like symptoms are reduced to 3–6% as compared to 16–18%, and neutropenia is almost absent in interferon-free treatment.

Sofosbuvir may reactivate hepatitis B in those who have been previously infected. The European Medicines Agency (EMA) has recommended screening all people for hepatitis B before starting sofosbuvir for hepatitis C in order to minimize the risk of hepatitis B reactivation.

== Interactions ==
Sofosbuvir (in combination with ledipasvir, daclatasvir or simeprevir) should not be used with amiodarone due to the risk of abnormally slow heartbeats.

Sofosbuvir is a substrate of P-glycoprotein, a transporter protein that pumps drugs and other substances from intestinal epithelium cells back into the gut. Therefore, inducers of intestinal P-glycoprotein, such as rifampicin and St. John's wort, could reduce the absorption of sofosbuvir.

In addition, coadministration of sofosbuvir with anticonvulsants (carbamazepine, phenytoin, phenobarbital, oxcarbazepine), antimycobacterials (rifampin, rifabutin, rifapentine), and the HIV protease inhibitor tipranavir and ritonavir is expected to decrease sofosbuvir concentration. Thus, coadministration is not recommended.

The interaction between sofosbuvir and a number of other drugs, such as ciclosporin, darunavir/ritonavir, efavirenz, emtricitabine, methadone, raltegravir, rilpivirine, tacrolimus, or tenofovir disoproxil, were evaluated in clinical trials and no dose adjustment is needed for any of these drugs.

== Pharmacology ==
=== Mechanism of action ===
Sofosbuvir inhibits the hepatitis C NS5B protein. Sofosbuvir appears to have a high barrier to the development of resistance.

Sofosbuvir is a prodrug of the Protide type, whereby the active phosphorylated nucleotide is granted cell permeability and oral bioavailability. It is metabolized to the active antiviral agent GS-461203 (2'-deoxy-2'-α-fluoro-β-C-methyluridine-5'-triphosphate). GS-461203 serves as a defective substrate for the NS5B protein, which is the viral RNA polymerase, thus acts as an inhibitor of viral RNA synthesis. Although sofosbuvir has a 3' hydroxyl group to act as a nucleophile for an incoming NTP, a similar nucleotide analogue, 2'-deoxy-2'-α-fluoro-β-C-methylcytidine, is proposed to act as a chain terminator because the 2' methyl group of the nucleotide analogue causes a steric clash with an incoming NTP. Sofosbuvir may act in a similar way.

=== Pharmacokinetics ===
Sofosbuvir is only administered orally. The peak concentration after oral administration is 0.5–2 hours post-dose, regardless of initial dose. Peak plasma concentration of the main circulating metabolite GS-331077 occurs 2–4 hours post-dose. GS-331077 is the pharmacologically inactive nucleoside.

Plasma protein binding of sofosbuvir is 61–65%, while GS-331077 has minimal binding.

Sofosbuvir is activated in the liver to the triphosphate GS-461203 by hydrolysis of the carboxylate ester by either of the enzymes cathepsin A or carboxylesterase 1, followed by cleaving of the phosphoramidate by the enzyme histidine triad nucleotide-binding protein 1 (HINT1), and subsequent repeated phosphorylation. Dephosphorylation creates the inactive metabolite GS-331077. The half life of sofosbuvir is 0.4 hours, and the half life of GS-331077 is 27 hours.Following a single 400 mg oral dose of sofosbuvir, 80% is excreted in urine, 14% in feces, and 2.5% in expired air recovery. However, of the urine recovery 78% was the metabolite (GS-331077) and 3.5% was sofosbuvir.

== Chemistry ==
Prior to the discovery of sofosbuvir, a variety of nucleoside analogs had been examined as antihepatitis C treatments, but these exhibited relatively low potency. This low potency arose in part because the enzymatic addition of the first of the three phosphate groups of the triphosphate is slow. The design of sofosbuvir, based on the ProTide approach, avoids this slow step by building the first phosphate group into the structure of the drug during synthesis. Additional groups are attached to the phosphorus to temporarily mask the two negative charges of the phosphate group, thereby facilitating entry of the drug into the infected cell. The NS5B protein is a RNA-dependent RNA polymerase critical for the viral reproduction cycle.

Sofosbuvir metabolism. Nucleoside = GS-331077, active triphosphate = GS-461203

== History ==
Sofosbuvir was discovered in 2007 by Michael J. Sofia, a scientist at Pharmasset, and the drug was first tested in people in 2010. In 2011, Gilead Sciences bought Pharmasset for about $11 billion. Gilead submitted the New Drug Application for sofosbuvir in combination with ribavirin in April 2013, and in October 2013 it received the FDA's Breakthrough Therapy Designation. In December 2013, the FDA approved sofosbuvir in combination with ribavirin for oral dual therapy of HCV genotypes 2 and 3, and for triple therapy with injected pegylated interferon (pegIFN) and RBV for treatment-naive people with HCV genotypes 1 and 4. Two months before, the FDA had approved another drug, simeprevir, as a hepatitis C treatment.

In 2014, the fixed dose combination drug sofosbuvir/ledipasvir, the latter a viral NS5A inhibitor, was approved; it had also been granted breakthrough status.

Prior to the availability of sofosbuvir, hepatitis C treatments involved 6 to 12 months of treatment with an interferon-based regimen. This regimen provided cure rates of 70% or less and was associated with severe side effects, including anemia, depression, severe rash, nausea, diarrhea, and fatigue. As sofosbuvir clinical development progressed, physicians began to "warehouse" people in anticipation of its availability. Sofosbuvir's U.S. launch was the fastest of any new drug in history.

== Society and culture ==
Sofosbuvir is on the World Health Organization's List of Essential Medicines.

=== Economics ===
Following its approval by the FDA in 2013, the price of sofosbuvir as quoted in various media sources in 2014 ranged from $84,000 to $168,000 depending on course of treatment in the U.S. and £35,000 in the United Kingdom for a 12-week regimine, causing considerable controversy. Sofosbuvir was more affordable in Japan and South Korea at approximately $300 and $5900 respectively for a 12-week treatment, with each government covering 99% and 70% of the cost respectively. In 2014, Gilead announced it would work with generic manufacturers in 91 developing countries to produce and sell sofosbuvir, and that it would sell a name brand version of the product in India for approximately $300 per course of treatment; it had signed agreements with generic manufacturers by September 2015.

==== United States ====
Since its launch, the price of sofosbuvir declined as more competitors entered the direct-acting antiviral (DAA) market. In 2020, the price for a course of sofosbuvir was $64,693 in the United States. In 2014, the list price of a 12-week combination treatment with a sofosbuvir-based regimen ranged from US$84,000 to $94,000. In April 2014, U.S. House Democrats Henry Waxman, Frank Pallone Jr., and Diana DeGette wrote Gilead Sciences Inc. questioning the $84,000 price for sofosbuvir. They specifically asked Gilead CEO John Martin to "explain how the drug was priced, what discounts are being made available to low-income patients and government health programs, and the potential impact to public health by insurers blocking or delaying access to the medicine because of its cost." Sofosbuvir is cited as an example of how specialty drugs present both benefits and challenges.

Sofosbuvir also is an excellent example of both the benefit and the challenge of specialty medications. On one hand, this agent offers up to a 95% response rate as part of an interferon-free treatment regimen for hepatitis C. Generally speaking, it is more effective and better tolerated than alternative treatments. Unfortunately, the current per pill cost—$1,000—results in an $84,000 treatment course, creating barriers to therapy for many. Patients, providers, and payors alike have expressed outrage, and the debate has even drawn the attention of the US Congress. Despite these concerns, sofosbuvir rapidly has become a top seller in the United States...

In February 2015, Gilead announced that due in part to negotiated discounts with pharmacy benefit managers and legally mandated discounts to government payers, the average discount-to-list price in 2014 was 22%. The company estimated that the average discount in 2015 would be 46%. According to the California Technology Assessment Forum, a panel of academic pharmacoeconomic experts, representatives of managed care organizations, and advocates for people with hepatitis, a 46% discount would bring the average price of treatment to about $40,000, at which price sofosbuvir-based treatment regimens represent a "high value" for people and healthcare systems.

Because of sofosbuvir's high price in the United States, by 2017, some states—such as Louisiana—were withholding the medicine from Medicaid patients with hepatitis until their livers were severely damaged. This puts "patients at increased risk of medical complications" and contributes to the "transmission of the hepatitis C virus". In an article published in May 2016 in Health Affairs, the authors proposed the invocation of the federal "government patent use" law which would enable the government to procure "important patent-protected" drugs at lower prices while compensating "the patent-holding companies reasonable royalties ... for research and development." By July 2017, Louisiana's health secretary Rebekah Gee, who described Louisiana as America's "public-health-crisis cradle", was investigating the use of the "government patent use" as a strategy.

==== Japan and South Korea ====
Unlike other comparable Western developed countries, sofosbuvir is far more affordable in Japan and South Korea at approximately $300 and $2165 cost to patients respectively for a 12-week treatment, as each government covers 99% and 70% of the original cost respectively.

==== Germany ====
In Germany, negotiations between Gilead and health insurers led to a price of €41,000 for 12 weeks of treatment. This is the same price previously negotiated with the national healthcare system in France, except that additional discounts and rebates apply in France depending on the volume of sales and the number of treatment failures.

==== Switzerland ====
In Switzerland, the price is fixed by the government every three years. The price in 2016 was CHF 16,102.50 (about 1:1 to the US dollar) for 24 pills of 400 mg.

==== United Kingdom ====
In 2020, the originator price per course of sofosbuvir was £35,443. In 2013, the price in the United Kingdom was expected to be £35,000 for a 12-weeks course. NHS England established 22 Operational Delivery Networks to roll out delivery, which was approved by the National Institute for Health and Care Excellence in 2015, and proposes to fund 10,000 courses of treatment in 2016–17. Each was given a "run rate" of how many people they were allowed to treat, and this was the NHS's single biggest new treatment investment in 2016.

==== Croatia ====
As of 2015, sofosbuvir is included on the list of essential medications in Croatia and its cost is fully covered by the Croatian Health Insurance Fund. As a result of negotiations with the manufacturer, only therapies with successful outcome would be paid by the Fund with the rest being covered by the manufacturer.

==== India ====
In July 2014, Gilead Sciences filed a patent for sofosbuvir in India. If the office of the controller general of patents had granted it, Gilead would have obtained exclusive rights to produce and sell sofosbuvir in the country. However, in January 2015, the Indian Patent Office rejected Gilead's application. Gilead's lawyers moved the Delhi High Court against this decision. That decision was overturned on appeal in February 2015. In the meantime, it granted Indian companies voluntary licenses (VLs), which allowed them to make and sell in a selected few countries at a discounted price. This agreement also granted 7% of the royalties to Gilead. However, the list of countries open to Indian firms under this agreement excluded 73 million people with hepatitis C.

==== Developing world ====
In 2014, Gilead announced it would seek generic licensing agreements with manufacturers to produce sofosbuvir in 91 developing countries, which contained 54% of the world's HCV-infected population. Gilead also said it would sell a name brand version of the product in India for $300 per course of treatment, approximately double a third party estimate of the minimum achievable cost of manufacture. It had signed licenses with generic manufacturers by September 2015. The leader of one Indian activist group called this move inadequate, but nine companies launched products, which "unleashed a fierce marketing war", according to India's The Economic Times.

In Egypt, which had the world's highest incidence of hepatitis C, Gilead offered sofosbuvir at the discounted price of $900 to the Egyptian government. The government in turn made it free to patients. Later, Gilead licensed a generic version to be available in Egypt.

The Access to Medicine Index ranked Gilead first among the world's 20 largest pharmaceutical countries in the Pricing, Manufacturing and Distribution category in both 2013 and 2014, citing Gilead's "leading performance in equitable pricing." In contrast, Jennifer Cohn of Doctors Without Borders and the organization Doctors of the World criticized the price of sofosbuvir as reflecting "corporate greed" and ignoring the needs of people in developing countries.

In Algeria, as of 2011 about 70,000 people were infected with hepatitis C. As of August 2015, Gilead had licensed its partners in India to sell sofosbuvir in Algeria. It had been criticized for not making the drug available in middle-income countries including Algeria prior to that.

== Controversies ==
The price has generated considerable controversy. In 2017, the range of costs per treatment varied from about $84,000 to about $50.

=== Patent challenges ===
In February 2015, it was reported that Doctors of the World had submitted an objection to Gilead's patent at the European Patent Office, claiming that the structure of sofosbuvir is based on already known molecules. In particular, Doctors of the World argued that the Protide technology powering sofosbuvir was previously invented by the Chris McGuigan team at Cardiff University in the UK, and that the Gilead drug is not therefore inventive. The group filed challenges in other developing countries as well. These challenges were unsuccessful.

=== Medical tourism ===
Due to the high cost of sofosbuvir in the U.S., as of 2016 increasing numbers of Americans with hepatitis C were traveling to India to purchase the drug. Similarly, increasing numbers of Chinese were also traveling to India to purchase sofosbuvir, which had not yet been approved for sale in China by the country's State Food and Drug Administration (SFDA).

== Research ==
Combinations of sofosbuvir with NS5A inhibitors, such as daclatasvir, ledipasvir or velpatasvir, have shown sustained virological response rates of up to 100% in people infected with HCV. Most studies indicate that the efficacy rate is between 94% and 97%; much higher than previous treatment options. That treatments could be conducted at very low costs was demonstrated by Hill and coworkers who presented data on 1,160 patients who used generic versions of solfosbuvir, ledipasvir, plus daclatasvir from suppliers in India, Egypt, China and other countries and reported over 90% success at costs of about $50 per therapy.

Sofosbuvir has also been tested against other viruses such as the Zika virus and severe acute respiratory syndrome coronavirus 2 (SARS-CoV-2).

=== DIY Home Synthesis ===
At DEF CON 32, Mixæl Swan Laufer, a representative of the Four Thieves Vinegar Collective, presented a talk titled "Eradicating Hepatitis C with BioTerrorism." The presentation argued that advancements in open-source tools and chemistry enable individuals to synthesize certain medications, such as Sovaldi, at home, potentially bypassing high pharmaceutical costs.

During the talk, Laufer demonstrated tools and techniques used by the collective to synthesize pharmaceuticals, showcasing examples of the medications created. To illustrate the efficacy and accessibility of the process, he consumed a dose of Sovaldi onstage, despite not having Hepatitis C, as a symbolic gesture of the drug's claimed safety.

== See also ==
- AT-527—a similar drug developed for the treatment of SARS-CoV-2
- Tenofovir alafenamide—a nucleotide reverse-transcriptase inhibitor that uses similar phosphoramidate prodrug technology
- Remdesivir—a nucleotide analogue RNA polymerase inhibitor originally intended to treat hepatitis C that uses similar phosphoramidate prodrug technology and displays very similar PK.
