= Hepatitis C virus nonstructural protein 5B =

Viral protein

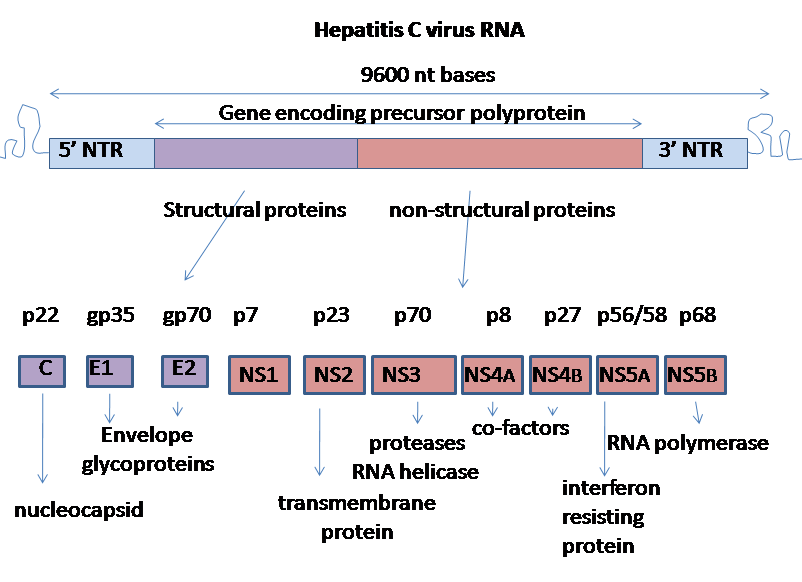
HCV genome

Nonstructural protein 5B (NS5B) is a viral protein found in the hepatitis C virus (HCV). It is an RNA-dependent RNA polymerase, having the key function of replicating HCV's viral RNA by using the viral positive RNA strand as a template to catalyze the polymerization of ribonucleoside triphosphates (rNTP) during RNA replication. Several crystal structures of NS5B polymerase in several crystalline forms have been determined based on the same consensus sequence BK (HCV-BK, genotype 1). The structure can be represented by a right hand shape with fingers, palm, and thumb. The encircled active site, unique to NS5B, is contained within the palm structure of the protein. Recent studies on NS5B protein genotype 1b strain J4's (HC-J4) structure indicate a presence of an active site where possible control of nucleotide binding occurs and initiation of de-novo RNA synthesis. De-novo adds necessary primers for initiation of RNA replication.

== Drugs targeting NS5B ==
Several drugs are either on the market or in various stages of research target NS5B as a means to prevent further viral RNA replication and thus treat or cure HCV. They are often used in combination with NS5A inhibitors.

- Beclabuvir, currently in clinical trials.
- Dasabuvir (Viekira Pak), non-nucleoside/nucleotide analog, approved by FDA in December 2014 (only in combination with ombitasvir, paritaprevir, and ritonavir).
- Deleobuvir, development terminated.
- Filibuvir, development terminated.
- Radalbuvir, currently in clinical trials.
- Setrobuvir, development terminated.
- Sofosbuvir (Sovaldi; Harvoni (combination with ledipasvir)): nucleotide analog, approved by the FDA in December 2013.
