= Lee Yong-hun (disambiguation) =

Lee Yong-hun (born 1942) is a South Korean judge.

Lee Yong-hun (Korean: 이용훈) is also the name of:

- Yong Hoon Lee (born 1955), South Korean academic
- Yonghoon Lee (born 1973), South Korean opera singer

== See also ==
- Lee Yeong-hun (disambiguation) (이영훈)
