= Young Hoon Lee =

South Korean Pentecostal pastor (born 1954)

- Born: Young Hoon Lee; 19 November 1954 (age 71); Seoul, South Korea
- Occupation: Evangelist

Korean name
- Hangul: 이영훈
- Hanja: 李永勳
- RR: I Yeonghun
- MR: I Yŏnghun
- Website: pastorlee.fgtv.com

Young Hoon Lee (Korean: 이영훈; born 19 November 1954) is a South Korean Pentecostal pastor. He has been the senior pastor of the church Yoido Full Gospel Church in Seoul since 2008.

== Biography ==
Lee was born on November 19, 1954, in Seoul, South Korea. He grew up in a Christian family, and in April 1964, he joined Yoido Full Gospel Church.

Lee studied theology at Yonsei University in Seoul. After graduating, he attended the Full Gospel Theology Seminary (now Hansei University) in Gunpo, and later attended the United Graduate School of Theology at Yonsei University, ultimately earning a master's degree in theology. Lee became ordained as a pastor in 1982. Afterwards, he earned another master's degree in theology at Westminster Theological Seminary in the United States, and later earned an MA and a PhD in religion and philosophy at Temple University.

Lee and his wife, Inja Baek, have a daughter together.

On July 11, 2024, during the 13th annual Population Day event hosted by the Ministry of Health and Welfare, the Moran Medal of the Order of Civil Merit was awarded in recognition of contributions to addressing population issues such as low birth rates and aging.

In December 2024, at the "Korean Church Vision Conference Commemorating 140 Years of Korean Christianity," they received the "Korean Church Award" in the fields of ministry and theology.

In January 2025, he garnered attention after being invited to the full schedule of the inauguration ceremony of Donald Trump, the 47th President of the United States.

== Education ==
- Daekwang High School (Graduated)
- Yonsei University (Theology / Th.B)
- Hansei University (Theology / Th.B)
- Yonsei University, United Graduate School of Theology (Theology / Th.M)
- Westminster Theological Seminary, USA (Theology / Completed Master's Coursework)
- Temple University Graduate School, USA (Philosophy of Religion / M.A)
- Temple University Graduate School, USA (Philosophy of Religion / Ph.D)
- Oral Roberts University, USA (Theology / Honorary Doctorate)

== Ministry ==
He began his ministry as pastor of Yoido Full Gospel Church in 1977.

In 2008, he succeeded David Yonggi Cho as senior pastor of Yoido Full Gospel Church.

He also became Superintendent of Assemblies of God of South Korea Yoido General Council in 2009.

In 2016, he became president of the Christian Council of Korea.

In 2022, he was unanimously elected as the President of the International Church Growth Institute (CGI), succeeding the late Reverend Yong-gi Cho.

== Controversies ==
=== Support for pastor Jeon Kwang-hoon ===
Young Hoon Lee, who has served as the senior pastor of Yoido Full Gospel Church since 2008, sparked controversy on May 16, 2023, when he attended the opening ceremony of the Liberty Korea Party's headquarters in Yeongdeungpo-gu, Seoul. During the event, he urged attendees to support Jeon Kwang-hoon in his call to "eradicate communist reds," a phrase now regarded as outdated propaganda. The controversy is heightened by the fact that Jeon, whom Pastor Lee supported, has previously made statements like "God, Freeze!" which are seen as blasphemous by the Christian community. Additionally, Jeon has already been labeled a "heretic" by mainstream Protestant groups in South Korea. The incident has drawn criticism, as it appears that the leader of Korea's largest church is publicly endorsing a figure deemed heretical by many within the faith. He has officially apologized for this.

=== COVID-19 prevention card controversy ===
Young Hoon Lee sparked controversy during a sermon by introducing a COVID-19 prevention card. He claimed that the card is effective in preventing and treating COVID-19, attributing its development to a Ph.D. from Yonsei University. He also mentioned that no one who used the card has tested positive and announced plans to provide the card to all families in the church. However, these statements have generated significant controversy.

== See also ==
- Christianity in Korea
