= Kookmin =

Kookmin may refer to:

- Kookmin Bank, a South Korean bank
- Kookmin University, a South Korean university
- Kukmin Ilbo, a South Korean newspaper
