= Jeon Kwang-hoon =

South Korean pastor (born 1956)

- 전광훈
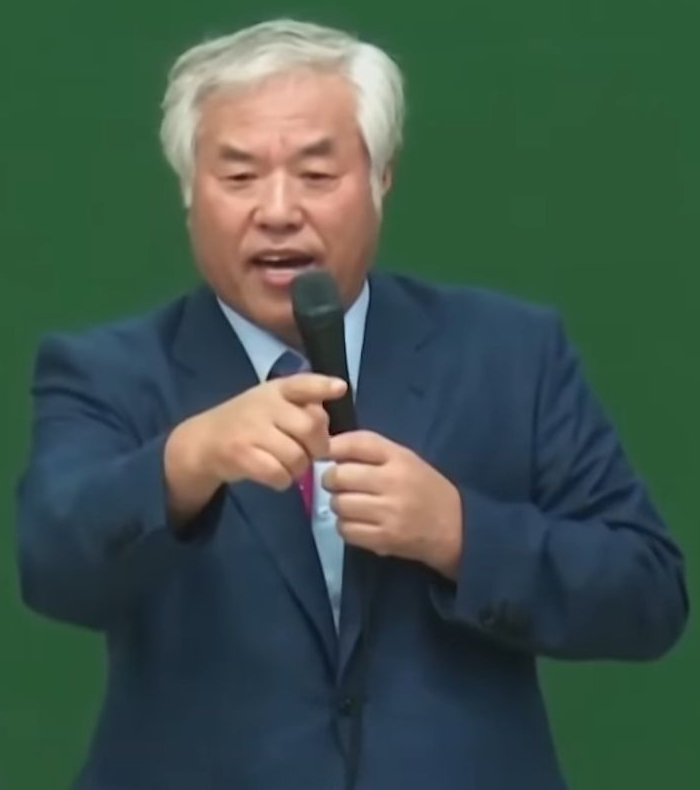
- Jeon Kwang-Hoon giving a lecture at SarangJeil Presbyterian Church
- Born: 28 March 1956 (age 70); Uiseong County, North Gyeongsang Province, South Korea
- Education: Daehan Theological University
- Occupations: Pastor, politician
- Political party: Independent

Korean name
- Hangul: 전광훈
- Hanja: 全光焄
- RR: Jeon Gwanghun
- MR: Chŏn Kwanghun

Jeon Kwang-hoon (Korean: 전광훈, born 28 March 1956), also Jun Kwang-hoon, is a South Korean pastor and politician. He is the incumbent President of the Christian Council of Korea. He was also the former President of the now-defunct Party of Practice of Christian Love, as well as one of key figures to found the Christian Liberal Party. He is head pastor at Sarang Jeil Church in Seoul, South Korea, and is known for his conservative political activism against the Moon Jae-in administration.

== Early life and education ==
Jeon Kwang-hoon was born in Uiseong County, North Gyeongsang Province, South Korea in 1956. He attended Kwangwoon Electronics Technical High School in Seoul. He received a bachelor's degree in theology at Daehan Theological University and a master's degree in Anyang University.

== Political positions ==
He is mentioned in many major South Korean media outlets as a far-right pastor. The New York Times described Jeon as a populist, pointing out similarities to Western right-wing populism.

He is officially an independent but is practically recognized as a member of the Christian Liberty Unification Party. He said the only thing that could blow up homosexuals and Juchesasangpas was CLUP, and appealed for support.

== Controversies ==
=== Cult Leader Allegations ===
- Considered a controversial figure in the South Korean Christian community, he is accused by several religious leaders of Protestant Churches in South Korea of being a heretic and a cult leader.
- According to members of the National Council of Churches in Korea (NCCK), it is said that the Sarang Jeil Church is considered a cult mainly because the church is a dissent from a more traditional Protestant denomination (Presbyterianism), in addition to the fact that the sermons of the church distort several biblical passages, applying views that go against everything taught in the Bible, and the fact that Jeon (who is the leader of Sarang Jeil Church) considers himself above God (to the point of making death threats against God) which is considered heresy and blasphemy in most traditional churches.

=== Religious and Election Interference ===
- At a rally in Daegu in 2005, Jeon said, "if female believers take off their underwear for me, they are one of my believers, and if they don't, they are shit," and led to the so-called "panties controversy." After the fact, in an interview with the Hankyoreh, he explained how the true intent of his statement was very much distorted.
- During the time of the 2007 Presidential election in South Korea he made various statements interfering with the election, including the statement, "if you do not vote for Elder Lee Myung-bak, you will be erased from the book of life," leading to criticism from many citizens and believers alike.
- In March 2020, Jeon was indicted over allegations of violating South Korean election law. According to the allegations, he encouraged supporters to vote against Moon at a rally outside of the official campaigning period. He was released on bail on the condition that he not take part in rallies related to his pending case.
- During the COVID-19 pandemic in South Korea, Jeon's church defied outbreak control measures, and was prohibited from gatherings.
- Jeon has been fined 2 million won for violating the Public Official Election Act by making statements in support of a specific candidate while being disqualified from voting. On October 18, 2024, the 11th Criminal Division of the Seoul Northern District Court found Jeon guilty for his remarks in support of candidate Kim Kyung-jae during a worship service in the 2022 presidential election period.
- On February 3, 2025, the National Office of Investigation of the Korean National Police Agency announced that during the investigation into the January 19 disturbance at the Western District Court, Jeon was booked as a suspect on charges of inciting rebellion.

=== COVID-19 and Legal Issues ===
- On 18 August 2020, the South Korean health ministry and government of Seoul filed separate criminal complaints against Jeon following his activity in organizing Liberation Day rallies in Seoul. He is accused of hindering infection control efforts by discouraging worshipers from getting tested, under-reporting church membership to health authorities, and attending rallies while under a quarantine order. Jeon's lawyers and Sarang Jeil Church have denied the allegations. From 13 August 2020 to 18 August 2020, the church was tied to more than 300 confirmed cases of COVID-19 transmission, leading to a tightening of social distancing rules in Seoul. Jeon himself, although asymptomatic, tested positive for the disease.
- On 3 September 2024, The Seoul Northern District Court overturned a previous not-guilty verdict and ruled in favor of the Seoul Metropolitan Government on September 3, regarding the case against Sarang Jeil Church (founded by Pastor Jun Kwang-hoon) for violating COVID-19 regulations by holding in-person services during the pandemic. The appellate court stated that considering the lack of knowledge about COVID-19 at the time and the absence of vaccines, the decision to ban gatherings entirely was aimed at protecting public health and did not unjustly infringe upon religious freedom. The court further explained that the actions taken by the church could have undermined the efforts of the state and citizens to prevent and control the spread of the virus during the early stages of the pandemic. In response, the church immediately announced its intention to appeal the decision to the Supreme Court.
- Members of the Sarang Jeil Church, led by Pastor Jeon Kwang-hoon, have been sentenced to prison for using Molotov cocktails and steel pipes to obstruct the lawful execution of a court order during the eviction process by the Jangwi District 10 Redevelopment Association in Seongbuk District, Seoul.
- Jeon has stirred controversy after it was revealed that he personally admitted to secretly burying the body of his first son, who died over 30 years ago, in a remote hillside.
- As concerns were raised about the unauthorized collection of personal information at the Gwanghwamun rally, Ko Hak-soo, chairman of the Personal Information Protection Commission, stated that illegal collection could lead to criminal penalties and that an investigation is planned.

=== Violent Obstruction and Controversial Claims ===
- Jun Kwang-hoon claimed that Yoido Full Gospel Church conducted a full survey of its members after the April 10, 2024, general election, alleging that the majority voted for the Liberty Unification Party. However, Yoido Full Gospel Church strongly denied these claims, stating that they are not true.
- Jeon Kwang-hoon faced criticism after dismissing public disapproval of his profanity-laden sermons by claiming that the insults he uses during sermons are "milder than those used by Jesus or John the Baptist."
- On October 6, 2024, during the Sunday Union Worship Service at Gwanghwamun, Jeon Kwang-hoon sparked controversy by claiming that he is the only theologian with the "correct answer" on demonology. He further fueled the debate by announcing an upcoming sermon on the subject of demonology.
- On October 8, 2024, Jeon Kwang-hoon was indicted by prosecutors for providing money to conservative YouTubers under the pretext of "advertising fees." The charges include payments for transportation expenses that violate the Kim Young-ran Act and allegations of trading proportional representation nominations.
- On December 4, 2024, Jeon Kwang-hoon sparked controversy by remarking that President Yoon Suk-yeol's declaration of martial law was a gift from God to the Korean church.
- In 2019, he was indicted for violating the Donation and Fundraising Act after collecting donations without approval from local government authorities during the so-called Gwanghwamun Patriotic Rally, which he organized.
- In 2025, Jeon Kwang-hoon, in response to MBC's report labeling him as a "heretical cult leader," made a controversial statement, saying, "If I am a heretical cult, then the entire Korean church is a heretical cult."

=== Allegations of corruption within Jeon Kwang-hoon's family ===
- Jeon Enoch, the son of Jeon Kwang-hoon and an evangelist, is under suspicion of violating denominational regulations by serving at Sarang Jeil Church while being enrolled at the Presbyterian Church of Korea (PCK) seminary, Chongshin University. There are indications that irregular methods were used in his admission and enrollment process, and controversies have arisen regarding his alleged defamation of professors and document forgery.
