= Anton Gartner =

Austrian geneticist

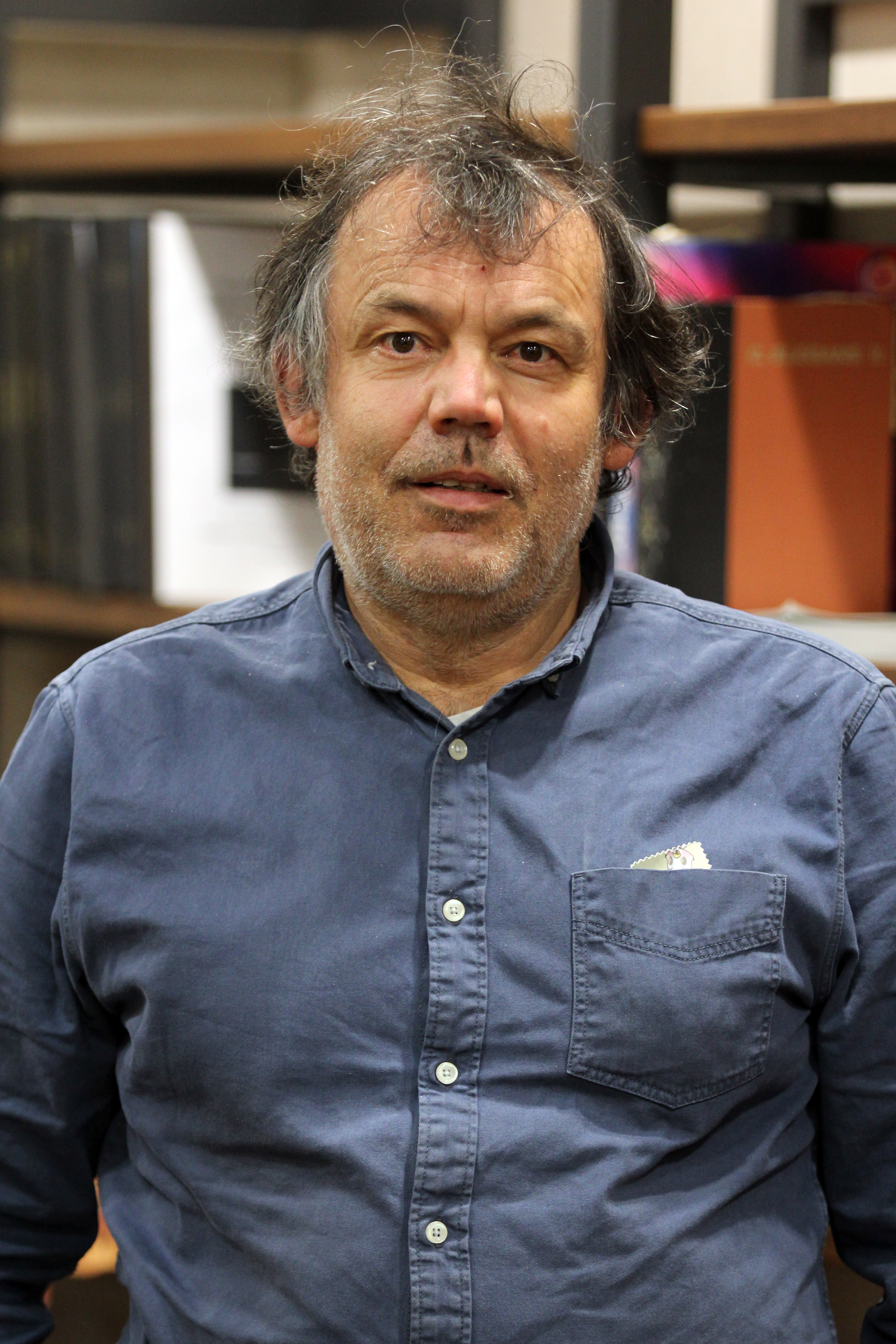
- Born: July 7, 1967; Vienna, Austria
- Education: University of Vienna
- Scientific career
- Fields: C. elegans genetics, genome stability
- Workplaces: Institute for General Biochemistry and Molecular Cell Biology, Cold Spring Harbor Laboratory, Research Institute of Molecular Pathology, Max Planck Institute of Biochemistry, University of Dundee, Institute for Basic Science, UNIST
- Theses: Identification of plant cell-cycle genes (1989); Studies on the pheromone dependent MAP kinase pathway in S. cerevisiae (1994)
- Doctoral advisors: Gustav Ammerer, Kim Nasmyth
- Other academic advisors: Heribert Hirt, Michael Hengartner
- Website: Center for Genomic Integrity

Anton Gartner (born July 7, 1967) is a geneticist and biologist utilizing the nematode worm Caenorhabditis elegans (C. elegans) as a model system. He is a distinguished professor at the Ulsan National Institute of Science and Technology (UNIST) in Korea and is one of the two associate directors of the IBS Center for Genomic Integrity located on the UNIST campus.

== Education ==
Anton completed Gymnasium in Neusiedl and then majored in genetics in the University of Vienna, Austria where he earned his M.S. and Ph.D. His master thesis was titled Identification of plant cell-cycle genes and was overseen by Professor Heribert Hirt from the Institute for Microbiology and Genetics. His Ph.D. was completed at the Research Institute of Molecular Pathology under Professors Gustav Ammerer and Kim Nasmyth. He continued his Ph.D. project at the Institute for General Biochemistry and Molecular Cell Biology, University of Vienna. His thesis was focused on basic mechanisms of signal transduction using budding yeast as a model system. After the completion of his Ph.D. program, Gartner fulfilled his national service as a Zivildienst working as a nurse in a unit for internal medicine at the Rudolfsspital hospital (de) in Vienna.

== Career ==
Staying at the University of Vienna, Anton worked as a postdoctoral scientist and teaching assistant at the Institute for General Biochemistry and Molecular Cell Biology until early 1997. His second postdoc position was in the Laboratory of Michael Hengartner, Cold Spring Harbor Laboratory on Long Island, New York, where he started working on C. elegans. His final postdoc was in a visiting capacity in the lab of Michael Glotzer at the Research Institute of Molecular Pathology. Moving to Germany, Anton worked as a junior group leader in the Department of Cell Biology at the Max Planck Institute for Biochemistry. In 2004, he moved to the University of Dundee, as a lecturer, then reader, and finally professor at the College of Life Sciences's Centre for Gene Regulation and Expression. In Dundee he was funded by Cancer Research UK (CRUK) Career Development and Wellcome Trust Senior Investigator Awards. His research continued to focus around C. elegans, particularly apoptosis, genome stability and DNA repair.

In 2019, he became a distinguished professor at UNIST and an associate director at the Institute for Basic Science Center for Genomic Integrity.

== Honors and awards ==
- 1997: EMBO long-term fellowship, Europe
- 1999: Schroedinger fellowship, Austria
- 2003: CR-UK Career Development Award, UK
- 2010: Wellcome Trust Senior Research Fellowship, UK

== See also ==
- Orlando D. Schärer
- Myung Kyungjae
