= Cho Yoon-kyoung =

Korean scientist

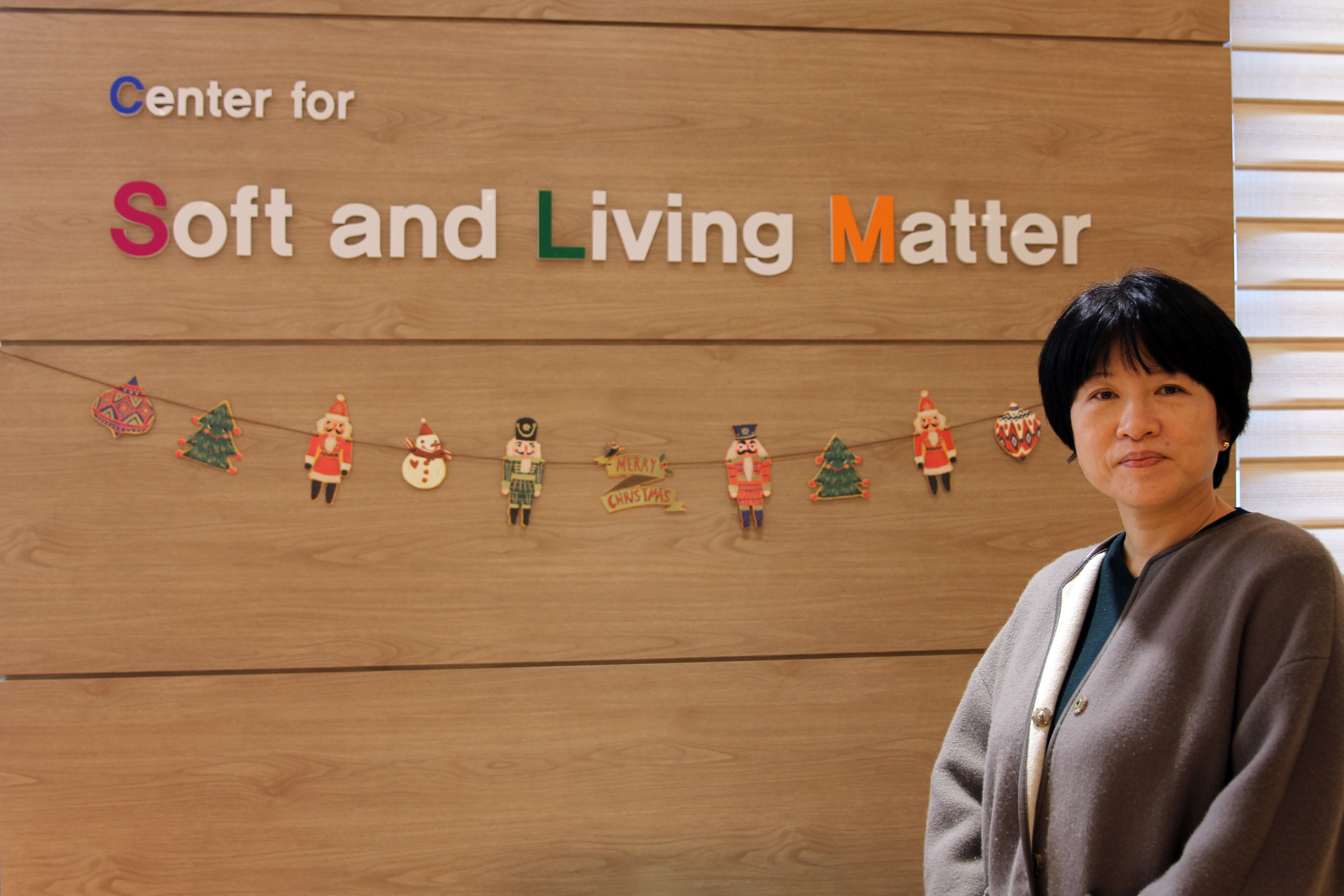
- Education: University of Illinois at Urbana–Champaign, POSTECH
- Known for: Lab-on-a-disc, biomedical engineering
- Scientific career
- Fields: Lab-on-a-chip, microfluidics, biosensors, translational research, basic research, nanomedicine
- Workplaces: IBS (Institute for Basic Science); UNIST (Ulsan National Institute of Science and Technology); SAIT (Samsung Advanced Institute of Technology); UIUC (University of Illinois at Urbana–Champaign); POSTECH (Pohang University of Science and Technology)
- Thesis: Structure and Dynamics of Confined Molecules (1999)
- Doctoral advisor: Steve Granick
- Other academic advisors: Lee Kun-Hong

Korean name
- Hangul: 조윤경
- Hanja: 趙允卿
- RR: Jo Yungyeong
- MR: Cho Yun'gyŏng
- Website: https://fruits.unist.ac.kr

Cho Yoon-Kyoung (Korean: 조윤경) is an interdisciplinary researcher involved in basic science to translational research in microfluidics and nanomedicine. She is a group leader in the Center for Soft and Living Matter at the Institute for Basic Science (IBS) and a full professor in Biomedical Engineering at the Ulsan National Institute of Science and Technology (UNIST), Ulsan, Korea. Cho is a member of the National Academy of Engineering of Korea and a Fellow of the Royal Society of Chemistry.

== Education ==
Cho majored in chemical engineering at the Pohang University of Science and Technology (POSTECH) graduating with B.S. and M.S. in 1992 and 1994, respectively. She completed her Ph.D. in materials science and engineering at the University of Illinois at Urbana–Champaign in 1999, her advisor was Steve Granick.

== Career ==
She worked at the Samsung Advanced Institute of Technology as a senior researcher from 1999 until 2008 where she participated in developing in vitro diagnostic devices with biomedical applications.

Joining the Ulsan National Institute of Science and Technology (UNIST) in 2008, she became the chair of the School of Nano-Bioscience and Chemical Engineering (2008–2014) and later the chair of the School of Life Sciences (2014–2015) and the director of World Class University (2009–2013) and Brain Korea 21 (2013–2015) programs. She has been a group leader in the Institute for Basic Science Center for Soft and Living Matter since 2015. From 2016, she is a full professor in the Department of Biomedical Engineering in UNIST

She has been an associate editor of Lab on a Chip from 2019 and previously served as an editorial board member (2013-2019). She also has been an advisory board member for Analyst and an editorial board member for Micromachines. In addition, she has been a board member of the Chemical and Biological Microsystems Society (CBMS).

She served as a member for Presidential Advisory Council on Science & Technology (2018) and advisory committee member for the Ministry of Personnel Management (2018).

== Research and achievements ==
Much of Cho's research has focused on centrifugal microfluidics. Cho and her team have developed lab-on-a-disc systems to provide a "sample-in and answer-out" type biochemical analysis solution with simple, size-reduced, and cost-efficient instrumentation. She demonstrated fully integrated virus enrichment and nucleic acids extraction on a chip, fully automated immunoassay, label-free isolation of circulating tumor cells, size fractionization of extracellular vesicles (EVs), RNA detection from urinary EVs, and electricity-free bacteria enrichment for urinary tract infection detection and rapid antimicrobial susceptibility test by directly testing clinical samples of patients, which allows high precision detection of biomarkers for monitoring the efficacy of therapy and emergent drug resistance for personalized medicine. In 2021, her research team was the first to program exosomes for the purpose of energy generation in living cells.

The other key area of Cho's research concerns microfluidic systems to understand intercellular communication. Biomimetic chips such as platelet chips or 3D human liver-on-a-chip have been designed to study the roles of EVs in cancer metastasis. She investigated morphological adaptations and mechanobiological behaviors of epithelial cells on a torus surface. In addition, her group is interested in nanomaterials, nanodevices, and nanofluidics which can provide nonconventional tools and platforms to enhance biosensing characteristics or to investigate physical, chemical, and biological properties of living matter.

== Awards and honors ==
Cho was elected Member of the National Academy of Engineering of Korea in 2020. She is a Fellow of Royal Society of Chemistry. Her work has been recognized by multiple awards, including National Top 100 R&D Performances (2019 and 2023), Korea's Top 5 Bio-field research outcome (2017, 2020), Faculty of the Year Award (UNIST, 2012 and 2020), Korean Woman Engineer of the Year (2010), SAMSUNG CEO's Award for Best Technology Achievement of the Year (2004, 2007), the Racheff Award for Outstanding Graduate Research (UIUC, 1998), and invited lectures at the Nobel Symposium on Microfluidics in Sweden (2017), and plenary seminar at MicroTAS 2010.

== Selected publications ==
- Gorkin, Robert; Park, Jiwoon; Siegrist, Jonathan; Amasia, Mary; Lee, Beom Seok; Park, Jong-Myeon; Kim, Jintae; Kim, Hanshin; Madou, Marc; Cho, Yoon-Kyoung (28 May 2010). "Centrifugal microfluidics for biomedical applications". Lab Chip. 10 (14). Royal Society of Chemistry: 1758–1773. arXiv:1802.05610. doi:10.1039/B924109D. PMID 20512178.
- Cho, Yoon-Kyoung; Lee, Jeong-Gun; Park, Jong-Myeon; Lee, Beom-Seok; Lee, Youngsun; Ko, Christopher (2007). "One-step pathogen specific DNA extraction from whole blood on a centrifugal microfluidic device". Lab on a Chip. 7 (5). Royal Society of Chemistry: 565–573. doi:10.1039/B616115D. PMID 17476374.
- Lee, Beom Seok; Lee, Jung-Nam; Park, Jong-Myeon; Lee, Jeong-Gun; Kim, Suhyeon; Cho, Yoon-Kyoung; Ko, Christopher (2009). "A fully automated immunoassay from whole blood on a disc". Lab on a Chip. 9 (11). Royal Society of Chemistry: 1548–1555. doi:10.1039/b820321k. PMID 19458861.
- Lee, Beom Seok; Lee, Yang Ui; Kim, Han-Sang; Kim, Tae-Hyeong; Park, Jiwoon; Lee, Jeong-Gun; Kim, Jintae; Kim, Hanshin; Lee, Wee Gyo; Cho, Yoon-Kyoung (2011). "Fully integrated lab-on-a-disc for simultaneous analysis of biochemistry and immunoassay from whole blood". Lab on a Chip. 11 (1). Royal Society of Chemistry: 70–78. doi:10.1039/C0LC00205D. PMID 21042620.
- Park, Jong-Myeon; Cho, Yoon-Kyoung; Lee, Beom-Seok; Lee, Jeong-Gun; Ko, Christopher (2007). "Multifunctional microvalves control by optical illumination on nanoheaters and its application in centrifugal microfluidic devices". Lab on a Chip. 7 (5). Royal Society of Chemistry: 557–564. doi:10.1039/B616112J. PMID 17476373.
- Michael, Issac; Kim, Dongyoung; Gulenko, Oleksandra; Kumar, Sumit; Kumar, Saravana; Clara, Jothi; Ki, Dong Yeob; Park, Juhee; Jeong, Hyun Yong; Kim, Taek Soo; Kwon, Sunghoon; Cho, Yoon-Kyoung (2020). "A fidget spinner for the point-of-care diagnosis of urinary tract infection". Nature Biomedical Engineering. 4 (6): 591–600. doi:10.1038/s41551-020-0557-2. PMID 32424198.
- Kim, Junyoung; Lee, Chaeeun; Kim, Inun; Ro, Jooyoung; Kim, Jungmin; Min, Yoohong; Park, Juhee; Sunkara, Vijaya; Park, Yang-Seok; Michael, Issac; Kim, Young-Ae; Lee, Hee Jin; Cho, Yoon-Kyoung (2020). "Three-dimensional Human Liver-chip Emulating Pre-metastatic Niche Formation by Breast Cancer-derived Extracellular Vesicles". ACS Nano. 14 (11): 14971–14988. doi:10.1021/acsnano.0c04778. PMID 32880442.
- Yu, Sun-Min; Li, Bo; Amblard, Francois; Granick, Steve; Cho, Yoon-Kyoung (2020). "Adaptive architecture and mechanoresponse of epithelial cells on a torus". Biomaterials. 265 120420. doi:10.1016/j.biomaterials.2020.120420. ISSN 0142-9612. PMID 33007611.
- Limi, Minji; Parki, Juhee; Lowe, Alarice C.; Jeong, Hyoung-oh; Lee, Semin; Park, Hee Chul; Lee, Kyusang; Kim, Gwang Ha; Kim, Mi-Hyun; Cho, Yoon-Kyoung (2020). "A Lab-on-a-Disc platform enables serial monitoring of individual CTCs associated with tumor progression during EGFR-targeted therapy for patients with NSCLC". Theranostics. 10 (12): 5181–5194. doi:10.7150/thno.44693. PMC 7196290. PMID 32373206.
- Park, Yang-Seok; Kim, Junyoung; Oh, Jung Min; Park, Seungyoung; Cho, Seungse; Ko, Hyunhyub; Cho, Yoon-Kyoung (25 November 2019). "Near-field electrospinning for three-dimensional stacked nanoarchitectures with high aspect ratios". Nano Letters. 20 (1): 441–448. doi:10.1021/acs.nanolett.9b04162. PMID 31763856.
- Kumar, Sumit; Han, Jae-A; Michael, Issac J.; Ki, Dongyeob; Sunkara, Vijaya; Park, Juhee; Gautam, Shreedhar; Ha, Hong Koo; Zhang, Liangfang; Cho, Yoon-Kyoung (2019). "Human platelet membrane functionalized microchips with plasmonic codes for cancer detection". Advanced Functional Materials. 29 (30) 1902669. doi:10.1002/adfm.201902669.
- Sunkara, Vijaya; Kim, Chi-Ju; Park, Juhee; Woo, Hyun-Kyung; Kim, Dongyoung; Ha, Hong Koo; Kim, Mi-Hyun; Son, Youlim; Kim, Jae-Ryong; Cho, Yoon-Kyoung (2019). "Fully automated, label-free isolation of extracellular vesicles from whole blood for cancer diagnosis and monitoring". Theranostics. 9 (7): 1851–1863. doi:10.7150/thno.32438. PMC 6485293. PMID 31037143.
- Kumar, Sumit; Michael, Issac J.; Park, Juhee; Granick, Steve; Cho, Yoon-Kyoung (August 2018). "Cloaked exosomes: biocompatible, durable, and degradable encapsulation". Small. 14 (34) 1802052. doi:10.1002/smll.201802052. PMID 30024108.
- Woo, Hyun-Kyung; Park, Juhee; Ku, Ja Yoon; Lee, Chan Ho; Sunkara, Vijaya; Ha, Hong Koo; Cho, Yoon-Kyoung (2019). "Urine-based liquid biopsy: Non-invasive and sensitive AR-V7 detection in urinary EVs from patients with prostate cancer". Lab on a Chip. 19 (1): 87–97. doi:10.1039/C8LC01185K. PMID 30500003.
- Woo, Hyun-Kyung; Sunkara, Vijaya; Park, Juhee; Kim, Tae-Hyeong; Han, Ja-Ryoung; Kim, Chi-Ju; Choi, Hyun-Il; Kim, Yoon-Keun; Cho, Yoon-Kyoung (2017). "Exodisc for rapid, size-selective, and efficient isolation and analysis of nanoscale extracellular vesicles from biological samples". ACS Nano. 11 (2): 1360–1370. doi:10.1021/acsnano.6b06131. PMID 28068467.
- Kim, Tae-Hyeong; Park, Juhee; Lim, Minji; Oh, Jung Min; Kim, Hyeongeun; Jeong, Hyunjin; Lee, Sun Ju; Park, Hee Chul; Jung, Sungmok; Kim, Byung Chul; Lee, Kyusang; Kim, Mi-Hyun; Park, Do Youn; Kim, Gwang Ha; Cho, Yoon-Kyoung (2017). "FAST: size-selective, clog-free isolation of rare cancer cells from whole blood at a liquid-liquid interface". Analytical Chemistry. 89 (2): 1155–1162. doi:10.1021/acs.analchem.6b03534. PMID 27958721.
- Park, Jiwoon; Sunkara, Vijaya; Kim, Tae-Hyeong; Hwang, Hyundoo; Cho, Yoon-Kyoung (2012). "Lab-on-a-Disc for Fully Integrated Multiplex Immunoassays". Analytical Chemistry. 84 (10): 2133–2140. doi:10.1021/ac300979f.
