= Rodney S. Ruoff =

American chemist

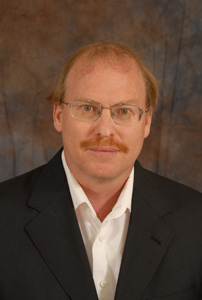
- Education: University of Illinois-Urbana, University of Texas at Austin
- Awards: Clarivate Citation Laureate, James C. McGroddy Prize for New Materials
- Scientific career
- Fields: Carbon and related materials
- Workplaces: Ulsan National Institute of Science and Technology, Center for Multidimensional Carbon Materials
- Thesis: Fourier-Transform Microwave Spectroscopy of Hydrogen-bonded Trimers and of Conformer Relaxation in Free Jets (1988)
- Doctoral advisor: Herbert S. Gutowsky
- Website: ruoff.science

Rodney S. "Rod" Ruoff is an American physical chemist and nanoscience researcher. He is one of the world experts on carbon materials including carbon nanostructures such as fullerenes, nanotubes, graphene, diamond, and has had pioneering discoveries on such materials and others. Ruoff received his B.S. in chemistry from the University of Texas at Austin (1981) and his Ph.D. in chemical physics at the University of Illinois-Urbana (1988). After a Fulbright Fellowship at the MPI fuer Stroemungsforschung in Goettingen, Germany (1989) and postdoctoral work at the IBM T. J. Watson Research Center (1990–91), Ruoff became a staff scientist in the Molecular Physics Laboratory at SRI International (1991–1996). He is currently UNIST Distinguished Professor at the Ulsan National Institute of Science and Technology (UNIST), and the director of the Center for Multidimensional Carbon Materials, an Institute for Basic Science Center located at UNIST.

== Research ==
His current research interests are accelerated basic science; AI, machine learning and robotics with materials and chemistry; carbon and boron nitride materials (fullerenes, carbon nanotubes, graphenes, diamond, porous carbons and others, and their BN and CBN analogs and variants); and liquid metal fluxes with dissolved first-row elements, particularly carbon, boron and nitrogen. He carries out this work at the Institute for Basic Science Center for Multidimensional Carbon Materials.

Rod Ruoff and his research groups have made seminal contributions to developing new synthesis techniques and improving our understanding of properties of novel materials including nanostructures and 2D materials, especially novel carbon materials (graphene, diamond, nanotubes, sp^{3}-sp^{2} hybrids, negative curvature carbon, carbon nanofoams, boron nitride allotropes, fullerenes, etc.). Some examples of pioneering studies, among others, include:(i) of the mechanics of C_{60}, and of nanotubes, including pullout of inner shell with respect to outer shell of the nanotube, and of a connection between mechanical deformation and structure on the one hand, and chemical reactivity on the other;(ii) of solubility phenomena of fullerenes, nanotubes, and graphene;(iii) of carbon-encapsulated metal nanoparticles;(iv) of patterned graphite and thus micromechanically exfoliated graphene-like flakes;(v) of scaled growth of graphene on copper and copper-nickel foils;(vi) of isotopically labeled graphites (graphite oxide) and graphene;(vii) of graphene oxide and reduced graphene oxide and composites and paper-like films composed of them;(viii) of the use of chemically modified graphene and graphite foam for electrode materials in electrical energy storage;(ix) of graphene as a support film for biological TEM;(x) of graphene as a protective coating against oxidation (and corrosion) (please also note Appl. Phys. Lett. 92, 052506 (2008) and Appl. Phys. Lett. 93, 022509 (2008)). Ruoff provided some personal perspectives on graphene and new carbon materials 'on the horizon' in 2012. As a graduate student at the University of Illinois-Urbana, Ruoff and colleagues published seminal papers on the structure of weakly bound clusters formed in supersonic jets, and of relaxation processes in supersonic jets.

His predictions with A. L. Ruoff about the mechanical response of fullerite under high pressure, and his work with colleagues on the unique solvation phenomena of C_{60} in various solvent systems, and of synthesis and structural characterization of supergiant fullerenes containing single crystal metal 'encapsulates', have demonstrated to the scientific community the novel properties of closed-shell carbon structures. He also co-developed a new in-situ mechanical testing device for measuring the tensile response of bundles of SWCNTs and individual MWCNTs inside of a scanning electron microscope. This work has yielded important insights into the mechanics and tribology of these systems, and suggested the possibility of very low friction linear bearings. Similarly, Ruoff and collaborators were the first to use solubility parameters to rationalize the solubility of fullerenes, of single-walled nanotubes, and of chemically modified graphenes. Furthermore, Rod is credited with first creating graphene by lithographic patterning to make single crystal graphite micropillars; he and his team achieved thereby single crystal multilayer graphene platelets.

From 2009, Ruoff and collaborators have demonstrated synthesis of large area monolayer graphene on copper foil by chemical vapor deposition, for which relatively high carrier mobilities have been obtained, and subsequently have used isotopic labeling and micro-Raman mapping to map grains and grain boundaries in such atom thick layers and to elucidate growth mechanisms, and studied their performance as transparent conductive electrodes. Ruoff and his collaborators have also made a series of advances in novel composite systems comprising chemically modified graphene platelets.

Ruoff and his team were the first to use graphene as electrodes of electrochemical capacitors, reporting on graphene supercapacitors in 2008. In 2011, Ruoff and his group reported on a new carbon, potentially having regions of 'negative curvature carbon' (NCC) with a remarkably high specific surface area of 3100 m^{2} g^{−1}, and atom-thick carbon sp^{2}-bonded walls that define pores varying in diameter from about 0.6 to 5 nm. They showed that this type of porous carbon ('a-MEGO') works very well as an electrode material for double-layer supercapacitors, a very exciting advance.

Ruoff and collaborators have reported advances in the synthesis of large-area single-crystal graphene by chemical vapor deposition on copper, Cu/Ni alloy, and sapphire. Their studies addressed orientation, adlayers, bilayer/trilayer stacking, and transfer. Demonstrations include wafer-scale monolayer graphene on sapphire, fold-free single crystals on Cu(111), and large AB-bilayer/ABA-trilayer domains. They also investigated surface oxygen and wet-oxidation effects, as well as grain-boundary and strain impacts on properties.

They reported growth of diamond and related phases in liquid metals, including ambient-pressure diamond synthesis, dissolution kinetics on Ni/Co, homoepitaxial diamond in liquid metal, and HF-CVD methods employing hot graphite plates. They also realized epitaxial single-crystal multilayer h‑BN on Ni(111).

In porous and functional carbons, contributions include zeolite‑templated carbons, long‑range ordered carbons from C_{60}, graphene‑oxide aerogels with radial/centrosymmetric structures, composites with liquid gallium, and stage‑1 cationic C_{60}‑intercalated graphene‑oxide films.

Chemical transformations and functionalization studies covered direct electrochemical modification dependent on Cu facets, reductive functionalization and fluorination toward diamond‑like phases (made and characterized F-diamane), covalent halide reactions, graphitization and thickness control of graphene oxide under pressure or heat, and the identification of graphenol (C_{6}OH).

Further advances include diamond‑like carbon nanofiber films, crystalline graphitic films with high stiffness and thermal conductivity, ultrathin‑graphite foams for phase‑change thermal storage, folding graphene films for Li‑ion batteries, carbon‑based electrical double‑layer capacitors, hybrid graphene–CNT films, studies of black phosphorus reactivity, and copper‑based MOFs.

Conceptual and theoretical contributions included outlining objectives for carbon science and probing charge transfer in liquid gallium and diamondoids.

In 2024, they introduced a novel method of synthetic diamond creation at 1 atmosphere of pressure in around 150 minutes without needing seeds.

In 2026 he published an analysis of why partial (about 20–50 at%) ^{13}C isotopic labeling is sufficient for studying carbon materials, and with colleagues a protocol for synthesizing single-crystal monolayer graphene on Cu/Ni(111) alloy foil.

He has an h-index of 167 in Web of Science and 189 in Google Scholar (July 2026). He is inventor or co-inventor on 60 issued patents.

== Positions ==
- UNIST Distinguished Professor, Ulsan National Institute of Science and Technology (2014–present)
- UNIST affiliations: Department of Chemistry, School of Materials Science, School of Energy and Chemical Engineering
- Editor-in-Chief, Watt (Springer Nature) (2026–present)
- Director of the Center for Multidimensional Carbon Materials (2013–present)
- Cockrell Family Regents Chair Professor, Mechanical Engineering, The University of Texas at Austin (2007–2013)
- Professor and John Evans Professor, Mechanical Engineering, Northwestern University (2000–2007)
- Associate professor, Physics, Washington University in St. Louis (1996–2000)
- Staff scientist, Molecular Physics Laboratory, SRI International (1991–1996)
- Postdoctoral researcher, IBM Thomas J. Watson Research Center (1990–1991)
- Postdoctoral researcher/Fulbright Fellow, Max Planck Institute fuer Stroemungsforschung (1989)

== Awards and fellowships ==
- Clarivate Citation Laureate (2018), Hall of Citation Laureates 2021
- James C. McGroddy Prize for New Materials (2018), American Physical Society
- American Carbon Society SGL Skakel Award (2016)
- Clarivate Analytics (Thomson Reuters) Highly Cited Researchers – Chemistry (2014–2021), Physics (2015–2018), Materials Science (2016, 2017, 2018, 2019, 2020, 2021 2022, 2023, 2024, 2025)
- Turnbull Award Materials Research Society (2014)
- Materials Research Society Fellow (2013)
- American Association for the Advancement of Science (AAAS) Fellow (2012)
- American Physical Society Fellow (2011)
- Distinguished Chair Visiting Professor (2005–2007), Sungkyunkwan University Advanced Institute of Science and Technology (SAINT)
- Fulbright Fellow (1989)
