= Steve Granick =

American scientist and educator

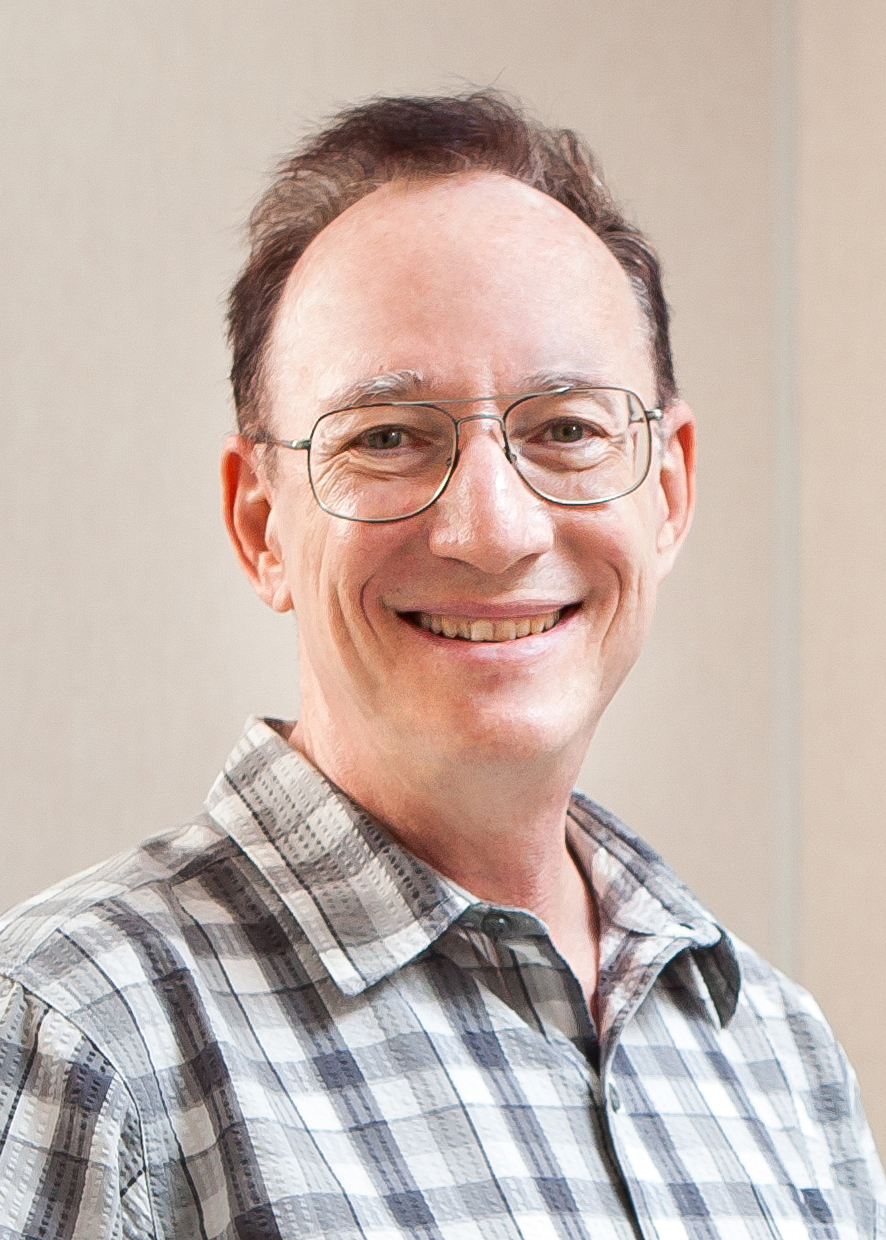
- Education: Princeton University; University of Wisconsin
- Known for: Physics; Chemistry of Soft Materials
- Awards: U.S. National Academy of Sciences
- Scientific career
- Fields: Chemistry; Applied Physics; Materials Science; Chemical Engineering
- Workplaces: University of Massachusetts-Amherst; IBS; UNIST; Univ. of Illinois
- Academic advisors: John D. Ferry; Pierre-Gilles de Gennes
- Doctoral students: Cho Yoon-Kyoung

Steve Granick is an American scientist and educator. In 2023 he joined the University of Massachusetts-Amherst as the Robert Barrett Endowed Chair of Polymer Science and Engineering, with joint appointment in the Chemistry, Physics, and Chemical Engineering Departments after serving as director of the Institute for Basic Science Center for Soft and Living Matter, an interdisciplinary blue-sky research center in Ulsan, South Korea that pursues basic science research. Until 2015 he was professor at the University of Illinois at Urbana-Champaign. He is a member of the American Academy of Arts and Sciences and the U.S. National Academy of Sciences.

== Education ==
Granick obtained his B.A. in sociology from Princeton University in 1978 by correspondence and after initially dropping out during his Junior year. He earned his Ph.D. in chemistry from the University of Wisconsin in 1982 with John D. Ferry. He did postdoctoral work at the University of Minnesota with M. V. Tirrell and at the Collège de France with Nobel-laureate Pierre-Gilles de Gennes.

== Academic career ==
Granick joined the faculty of the University of Illinois at Urbana-Champaign in 1985 and rose through the ranks to become Racheff Chair Professor of Materials Science and Engineering and concurrently professor of physics and biophysics, professor of chemistry, and professor of chemical and biomolecular engineering. In 2014, after thirty years at the University of Illinois, he moved to South Korea to join the Institute for Basic Science (IBS), founding the Center for Soft and Living Matter with additional appointments as professor of chemistry and physics at UNIST. In 2023 he joined the University of Massachusetts-Amherst as the Robert Barrett Endowed Chair of Polymer Science and Engineering, with joint appointment in the chemistry, physics, and chemical engineering departments.

== Research and achievements ==
Granick is the author of more than 300 scientific articles and has made fundamental contributions to the chemistry and physics of soft materials. By early 2023, his publications had received over 30,000 citations with h-index of 93.

His research interests range from the study of active matter to the chemistry and physics of visualized macromolecules, vesicles, and supracolloidal materials. The early work in Granick's career focused on confined liquids. Granick was a pioneer in the field of nanorheology and molecular tribology. Other early work concerned molecular mobility at polymer surfaces. This progressed to later studies showing how biological membranes interact with their environments.

More recently, Granick and his research team work across disciplines to explore imaging, assembly, behavior and interactions of molecules, colloidal particles, and their assemblies. He made the first measurements of polymer surface diffusion in the key limit of dilute concentration and he identified the important class of physical problems where diffusion is anomalous yet Brownian. His laboratory became interested in many instances of molecular mobility measured at the single-molecule level, including active matter and transport in living cells.

The other principal current area of Granick's research concerns Janus colloidal particles, their self-assembly at rest and driven outside equilibrium. The scientific importance is to understand natural selection in the colloid world.

== Public service and international experience ==
The goal of my lab’s research is to think like a molecule, to learn to second-guess what a molecule would decide to do when confronted by external constraints in its complex environment.

— Steve Granick

Steve Granick served as Chair of the Department of Energy (DOE) Council on Materials Panel on Polymers at Interfaces and Chair of the Division of Polymer Physics of the American Physical Society (APS). He holds or has held honorary or visiting positions at numerous international universities.

== Honors and awards ==
Granick was elected Member of the U.S. National Academy of Sciences in 2015, and Member of the American Academy of Arts and Sciences in 2016. He is a Fellow of the American Physical Society. He is the recipient of numerous international awards, including the APS (American Physical Society) national Prize for Polymer Physics, the ACS (American Chemical Society) national Prize for Surface and Colloid Science, and the Paris-Sciences Medal.
