= Hyo-Won Woo =

South Korean composer (born 1974)

- Born: Seoul, South Korea
- Other names: Hyowon Woo
- Education: Sungshin Women’s University
- Occupations: Composer; Academic teacher
- Organizations: Seoul Theological University

Korean name
- Hangul: 우효원
- Hanja: 禹孝元
- RR: U Hyowon
- MR: U Hyowŏn
- Website: hyowonwoo.com

Hyo-Won Woo (also Hyowon Woo, Korean: 우효원; Hanja: 禹孝元, born 1974) is a South Korean composer, especially of choral music. She uses elements from both Korean music and Western contemporary composition techniques.

== Career ==
Woo was born in Seoul in 1974. Her father was an artist, her mother a pianist. She graduated from Sungshin Women's University.

In 1995 she became composer in residence with the Seoul Ladies' Singers, conducted by Hak-Won Yoon whom she had met singing as a student in the Yongrak Presbyterian Church Choir which he also conducted. She received a commission to compose a missa brevis for women's choir to be performed on an Asia tour in 1996. From 1999 she composed for the Incheon City Chorale, also conducted by Yoon. In 2002 she composed Gloria for a concert tour of the Asian Youth Choir. She wrote an oratorio, Moses, in 2011.

In several works, she combines influences from Western contemporary music and from Korean traditional music, creating new Korean choral music. The musicologist Yoonchung Chang analysed the combination specifically for Gloria in a 2012 thesis. Traditional elements include scales and rhythmic patterns. She also uses Sikimsea, Korean melodic ornaments with "subtle shading and nuance of tone using degrees of vibrato and sliding of pitch". Another characteristic element is the distinction of vibrato, often reserved for the main note of a scale, and non-vibrato. The vibrato is different on a long note, which should be sung first "in a straight style and then begin to vibrate slowly over a wide range, becoming increasingly faster and narrower", and on short notes when it begins right away.

Woo taught music at the Seoul Theological University and Hansei University. She has taught at the Chorus Center Academy in Seoul and is a guest lecturer at the University of Michigan. Her works have been performed internationally. Her oratorio Creo on the Creation was performed as part of the 10th World Symposium on Choral Music in Seoul in August 2014, conducted by Hak-Won Yoon. It was given its US premiere by the Manhattan Chorale conducted by Craig Arnold in New York on 18 October 2016, and its European premiere in Reims, France, by the Choeur Nicolas de Grigny in November 2016.

== Selected works ==
- Missa brevis, for unaccompanied women's voices (1996)
- Cheo-Yong, for eight unaccompanied voices (1999)
- Oh! Deahanminguk, for mixed choir, two pianos, timpani and Korean drums (2002)
- Gloria, for unaccompanied mixed choir (2002)
- ME-NA-RI, for unaccompanied mixed choir in three groups, with Korean percussion (2005)
- Alleluja, for eight unaccompanied voices (2005)
- Choral Panso-ri Su-gung Ga, for mixed choir, Korean traditional solo singer and buk (2007)
- Pal-So-Seong for eight unaccompanied voices (2008)
- O Magnum Mysterium, for eight unaccompanied voices (2008)
- Te Deum, for unaccompanied mixed choir (2010)
- Jung gwaJung, for mixed choir with gayageum (2011)
- Moses, for mixed choir with orchestra, two pianos, various instruments (2011)
- Creo, oratorio for mixed chorus, horn, strings, and percussion (2014)
- Harmonia Mundi, oratorio for mixed chorus and orchestra (2024)

== Bibliography ==
- Chang, Yoonchung (2012). "Korean traditional elements and contemporary compositional techniques in Hyowon Woo's choral music as reflected in Gloria" (PDF). digital.library.unt.edu.
- "Creo de Hyo-Won Woo" (in French). Choeur Nicolas de Grigny. 23 November 2016.
- "Hyo-Won Woo". GIA Music.
- "우효원 HYOWON". ISCM Korea (in Korean).
- "CREO: A U.S. Premiere Manhattan Chorale". usa-newyork.mofa.go.kr.
- "Choral Music at UCI presents / Composer Hyo-won Woo / Creo: New Wave of Korean Choral Music". arts.uci.edu. 26 October 2016.
- "Concert Program". IFCM 10th World Symposium on Choral Music in Seoul. 2014.
