= David Yonggi Cho =

South Korean Christian minister (1936–2021)

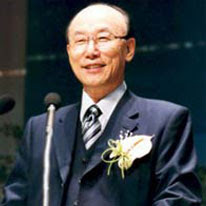
- Born: 14 February 1936; Uiju-gu, Ulsan, Korea, Empire of Japan
- Died: 14 September 2021 (aged 85); Seoul, South Korea
- Education: Full Gospel Bible College; Kookmin University
- Occupation: Evangelist
- Spouse: Kim Sung Hae (Deceased)

Ecclesiastical career
- Religion: Christianity (Pentecostal)
- Congregations: Yoido Full Gospel Church
- Title: Doctor (Honorary)

Korean name
- Hangul: 조용기
- Hanja: 趙鏞基
- RR: Jo Yonggi
- MR: Cho Yonggi
- Website: davidcho.fgtv.com

David Yonggi Cho (Korean: 조용기; 14 February 1936 – 14 September 2021 as David Yungi Cho) was a South Korean Pentecostal Pastor. He was the founder of the Yoido Full Gospel Church (Assemblies of God), which he started in a tent with 5 people (including his future mother-in-law Choi Ja-shil and her children as its first members), which eventually became the world's largest congregation, with a membership of 830,000 (as of 2007).

== Early life ==
Cho was born on 14 February 1936, in Ulju County, now part of Ulsan. The son of Cho Doo-chun and Kim Bok-sun, Cho was the eldest of five brothers and four sisters. He graduated from middle school with honours. Because his father's sock and glove business went bankrupt, he could not afford high school or university tuition. Subsequently, he enrolled in an inexpensive technical high school to learn a trade. At the same time, he began frequenting an American army base near his school, and learned English from soldiers whom he befriended. He mastered English quickly, and became an interpreter for the commander of the army base and the principal of his school.

Raised initially as a Buddhist, a visit from a Christian girl led Cho to convert to Christianity at the age of 17, after he was diagnosed with tuberculosis. He believed that he was miraculously healed, as described in his testimony of conversion. Sensing what he believed to be God calling him to the ministry, Cho began working as an interpreter for the American evangelist Ken Tize. In 1956, he received a scholarship to study theology at Full Gospel Bible College in Seoul. While there, he met Choi Ja-shil, who became his mother-in-law and a close ministerial associate. He graduated in March 1958.

== Wider ministry ==
Cho spent more than 44 years emphasizing the importance of cell group ministry, which he believed was the key to church growth, as well as team ministry.

In November 1976, Cho founded Church Growth International, an organization dedicated to teaching the principles of evangelism and church growth to pastors all over the world. In January 1986, he led the way in establishing the Elim Welfare Town, a facility for the elderly, young, homeless, and unemployed. The latter would be given training and a choice of four occupations. In 1988, he founded newspaper company, Kukmin Ilbo. He was Chairman of the World Assemblies of God Fellowship from 1992 to 2000 and did not pursue another term, and had served as Chairman of the Korean Christian Leaders Association since November 1998. In February 1999, he began serving as Chairman of the Good People charity organization.

In 2008, Cho retired, with Young Hoon Lee succeeding him as senior pastor.

== Death ==
Cho died on 14 September 2021 at the age of 85 due to complications from a stroke.

== Published works ==
- Paul Yonggi Cho (1979) The Fourth Dimension. Logos International .
- Paul Yonggi Cho (1988) Successful Home Cell Groups. Bridge Publications . ISBN 978-0-88270-513-2
- Paul Yonggi Cho (1989) The Holy Spirit My Senior Partner. Word Books. ISBN 978-0-85009-312-4

== Controversies ==
In March 2011, Cho became a subject of controversy when he reportedly made comments suggesting that the 2011 Tōhoku tsunami "could be a warning from God to Japan, which has become an increasingly materialistic, secular and idol-worshiping country." However, as the context of the interview was distorted, a text of apology was announced by The News Mission.

In September 2011, 29 church elders filed a lawsuit by South Korean prosecutors. The prosecutors began an investigation of Cho's alleged embezzlement of 23 billion won ($20 million USD) from the Yoido Full Gospel Church's funds. A national broadcaster, MBC, released a documentary that claimed the money had been used to buy properties for Bethesda University in Anaheim, California, United States, which Cho founded.

In 2014, Cho was convicted of embezzling $12 million USD in church funds that he bought from his son Cho Jong-Un.

== See also ==
- Phil Pringle
- Christianity in Korea
