= Lee Yeong-hun =

Lee Yeong-hun (이영훈) or Ri Yŏng-hun (리영훈) is the name of:

- Lee Young-hoon (born 1951), South Korean economist
- Young Hoon Lee (pastor) (born 1954), South Korean pastor
- Lee Young-hoon (composer) (1960–2008), South Korean composer
- Lee Yeong-hoon (born 1982), South Korean actor
