= Myung Kyungjae =

South Korean biologist (born 1968)

- 명경재
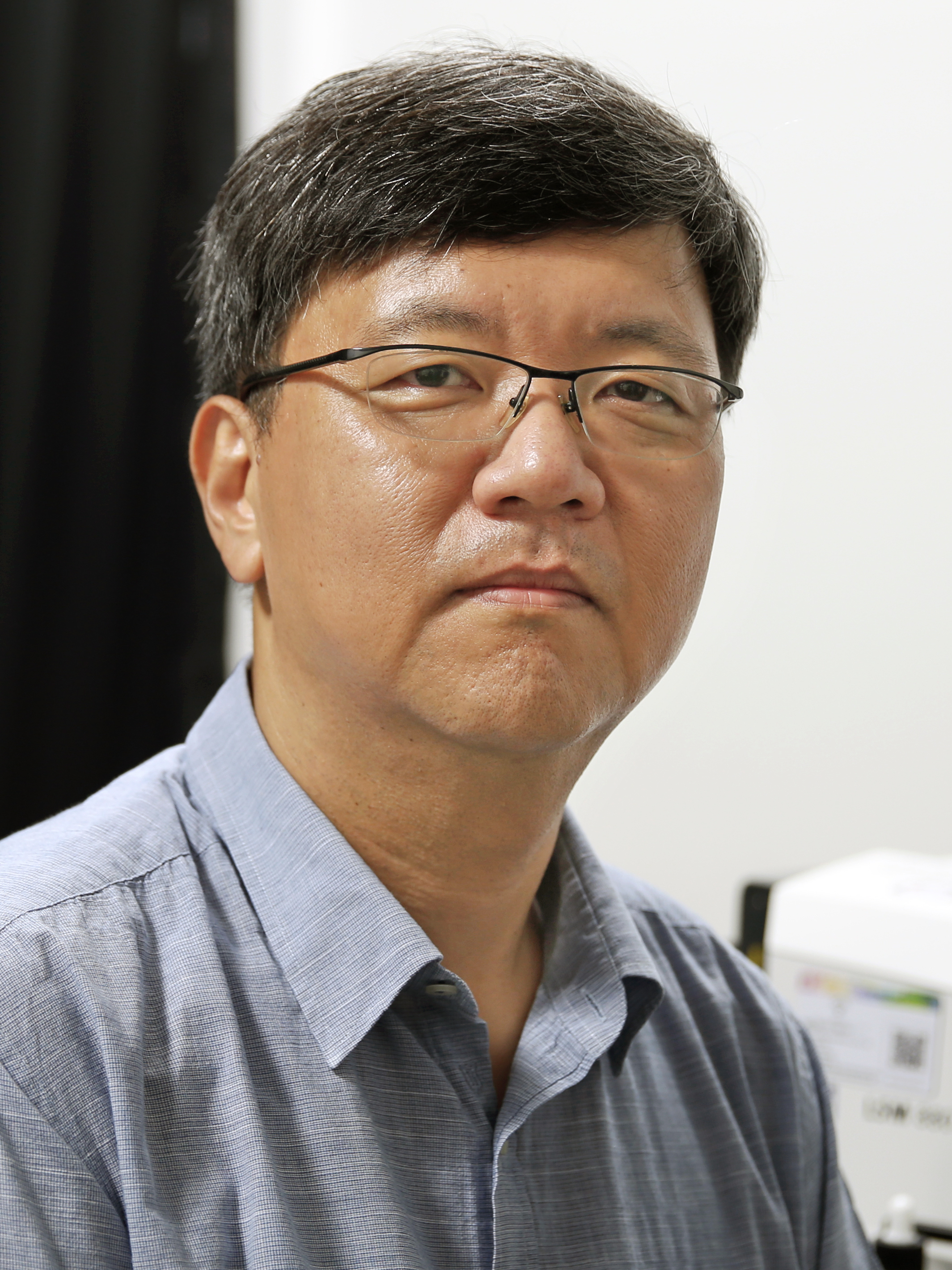
- Born: May 4, 1968; Seoul, South Korea
- Education: Seoul National University, Brown University
- Scientific career
- Fields: DNA repair, DNA replication, DNA recombination and DNA damage response, cancer biology, translational research
- Workplaces: National Human Genome Research Institute, KAIST, POSTECH, UNIST, Institute for Basic Science
- Theses: A normal Arg- tRNA complements the rad18x mutation in Schizosaccharomyces pome (1993); Isolation and characterization of KARP-1, a p53-dependent DNA-damage inducible gene (1999)
- Doctoral advisor: Eric A. Hendrickson
- Other academic advisors: Sang Dai Park

Korean name
- Hangul: 명경재
- Hanja: 明京在
- RR: Myeong Gyeongjae
- MR: Myŏng Kyŏngjae
- Website: Center for Genomic Integrity

Myung Kyungjae (Korean: 명경재; born May 4, 1968) is a biologist researching DNA repair pathways at the molecular level. He is a distinguished professor at the Ulsan National Institute of Science and Technology (UNIST) and the director of the IBS Center for Genomic Integrity located on the UNIST campus. He is on the editorial board of various peer-reviewed journals and is a member of multiple scientific societies.

== Education ==
Majoring in zoology, Myung received his bachelor's from Seoul National University (SNU) graduating with honors in 1991. Continuing at SNU, he then majored in molecular biology and graduated with a M.S. in 1993 after studying under Professor Sang Dai Park. He completed a Ph.D. in molecular biology, cell biology and biochemistry from Brown University in 1999 under Professor Eric A. Hendrickson. His thesis was recognized with a Barry Jay Rosen Memorial Award.

== Career ==
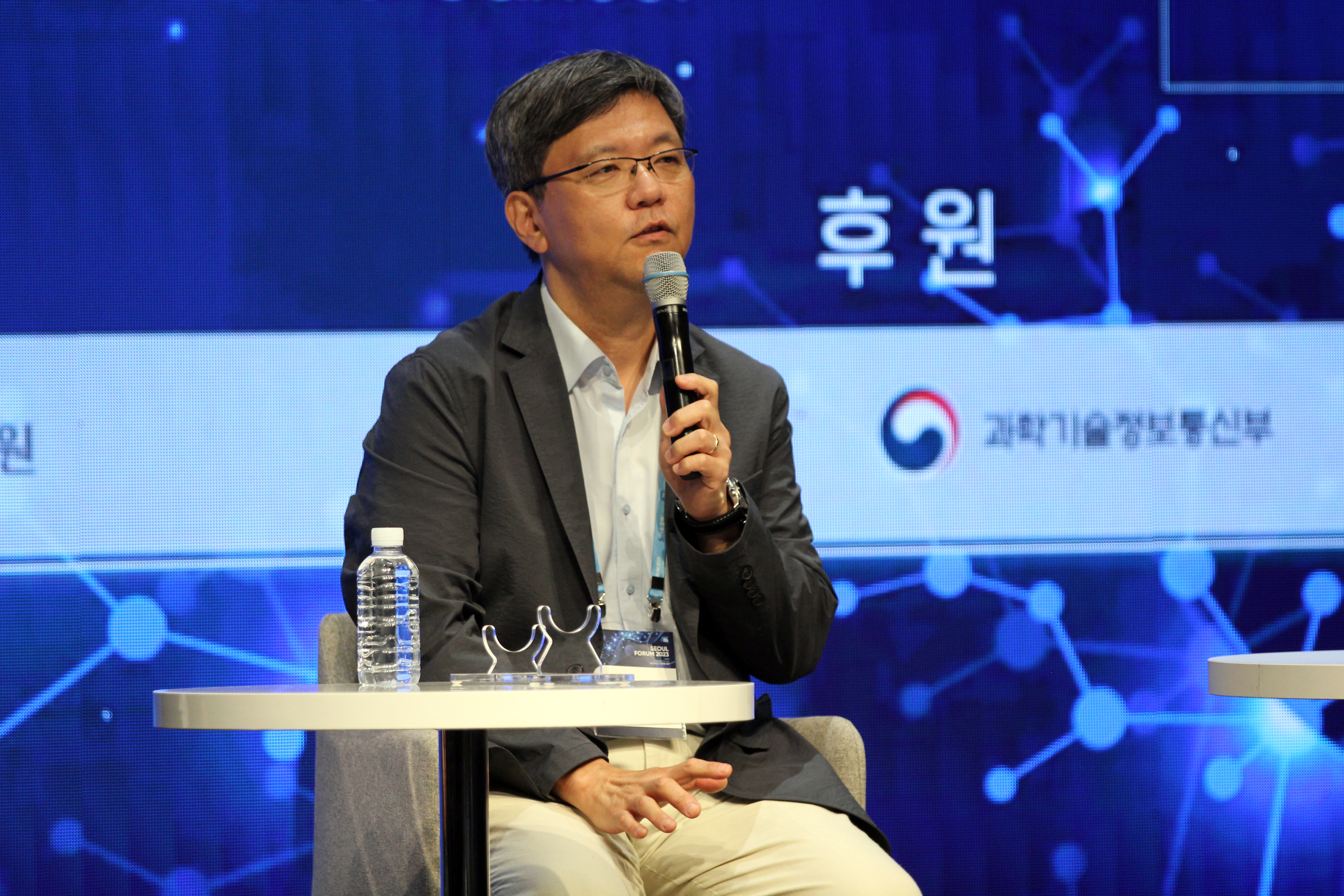
Myung Kyungjae speaking at Seoul Forum 2023

Myung did his postdoctoral training at Ludwig Institute for Cancer Research in the University of California, San Diego from 1999 to 2002 under Professor Richard Kolodner. He was awarded with a research fellowship from the Damon-Runyon-Winchell Cancer Research Foundation during the post-doc period. His first appointment was as an investigator and section head in the Genetics and Molecular Biology Branch of the National Human Genome Research Institute (NHGRI) under the National Institutes of Health. He was promoted to a senior investigator and section head in 2009, a position he held until 2014.

In addition to his position at the National Human Genome Research Institute, he concurrently held a position at POSTECH in the Division of Molecular and Life Science as an adjunct professor from 2011 until 2014. From 2013, he worked as an adjunct professor at KAIST in the Department of Biological Sciences and at the Ulsan National Institute of Science and Technology (UNIST) in the School of Nano-Bioscience and Chemical Engineering. The following year he fully relocated to Ulsan where he became a distinguished professor in the School of Life Sciences at UNIST while also becoming the founding director of the IBS Center for Genomic Integrity, a collaboration with the Institute for Basic Science.

Myung has been a guest associate editor for the journal PLoS Genetics, a guest editor for Mutation Research, and been on the Editorial Board for Genome Instability and Disease, Genomics, Genome Integrity, and Molecular and Cellular Biology. He is also a member of the American Association for Cancer Research, Genetics Society of America, Korean-American Scientists and Engineers Association, Environmental Mutagenesis and Genomics Society, Korean Society for Biochemistry and Molecular Biology, and Korean Society for Integrative Biology.

== Honors and awards ==
- 2017: Scholar of the Year, Genetic Society of Korea
- 2014: Scientist of the Year Award, Korean-American Scientists and Engineers Association (KSEA) and Korean Federation of Science and Technology Societies (KOFST)
- 2013: Outstanding Service Award, KSEA Washington Metro Chapter
- 2013: US Government Service Award (10 years), NHGRI, NIH
- 2012: Director of the Year, KSEA
- 2008: Bea Singer Young Investigator Award (GRC DNA damage, Mutagenesis and Cancer)
- 2008: US Government Service Award (5 years), NHGRI, NIH
- 2006: Society of Biomedical Research/Chong Keun Dang Award for achievements in biomedical research
- 2002: Sewoohue Award for Research Achievement
- 2002: Leading Korean-American, Chooang ILBO
- 2001: James Kerr Award for Research Excellence
- 1999: Travel Grant Award, American Society for Microbiology
- 1999: Barry Jay Rosen Memorial Award, Brown University

== See also ==
- Orlando D. Schärer
- Anton Gartner
