= Daehan Theological University =

Presbyterian seminary in Anyang, South Korea

- Hangul: 대한신학대학원대학교
- Hanja: 大韓神學大學院大學校
- RR: Daehan sinhak daehagwon daehakgyo
- MR: Taehan sinhak taehagwŏn taehakkyo

Daehan Theological Seminary is a seminary providing training for prospective members of South Korea's Presbyterian clergy. The campus is located in Anyang City, Gyeonggi province. The current president is Lee Seon (이선).

== Academics ==
Much of the graduate training is devoted to the M.Th. and M.Div. degrees, which are targeted to future ministers. However, departments of Social Welfare and Administration provide some alternative courses of study.

== History ==
The school shares its origin with Anyang University. The seed of both schools was planted in the Presbyterian Seminary established at Namdaemun Church in Seoul in 1948 by Yoon Pil Seong and others. Daehan Theological Seminary was not opened as a separate institution until 1998, at which time it offered the Master of Divinity (M.Div.) degree. In 2000, it began to offer the Master of Theology (Th.M.) degree as well.

== See also ==
- List of colleges and universities in South Korea
- Education in South Korea
