= Yoido Full Gospel Church =

- 여의도 순복음 교회
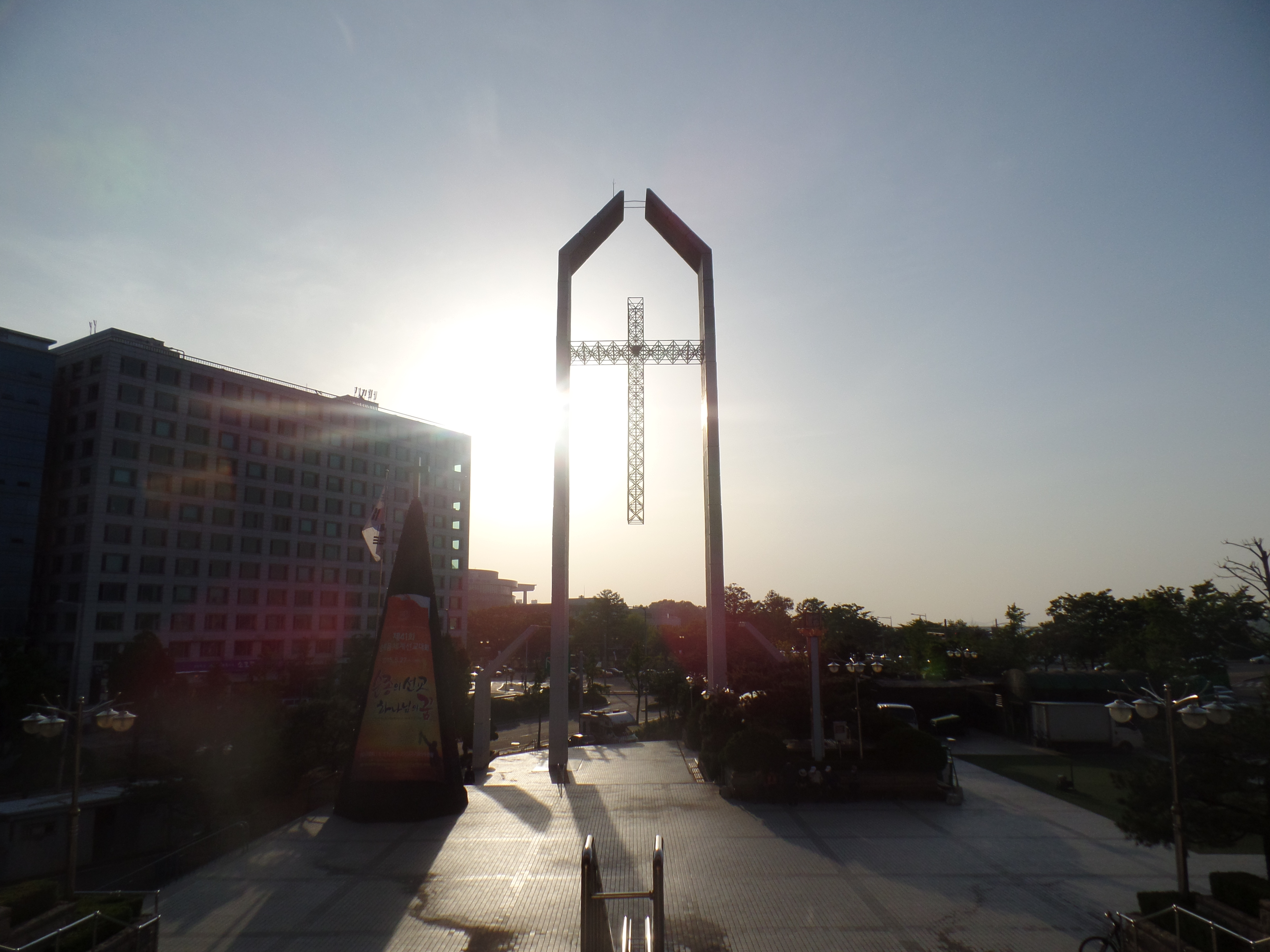
- Yoido Full Gospel Church
- 37.5310°N 126.9232°E
- Location: Yoido Island, Seoul
- Country: South Korea
- Denomination: Pentecostal
- Churchmanship: Full Gospel/Pentecostal
- Website: Official website

History
- Former name: Full Gospel Central Church (1973–1990)
- Status: Megachurch
- Founded: 1973
- Founder(s): David Yonggi Cho; Choi Ja-shil

Architecture
- Functional status: Active
- Style: Modern

Specifications
- Capacity: 12,000

Clergy
- Pastor: 526

- Yoido Full Gospel Church
- Hangul: 여의도 순복음 교회
- Hanja: 汝矣島純福音敎會
- RR: Yeouido sunbogeum gyohoe
- MR: Yŏŭido sunbogŭm kyohoe

Yoido Full Gospel Church (Korean: 여의도 순복음 교회) is a Pentecostal church affiliated with the Assemblies of God on Yeouido (Yoi Island) in Seoul, South Korea. With about 870,000 members, it is the largest Pentecostal Christian congregation in South Korea. Founded by David Yonggi Cho and Choi Ja-shil in 1958, the church is presently led by Young Hoon Lee. The church has several satellite locations throughout the city of Seoul. The current building, relocated in 1973, was constructed by Sampoong Construction Industries, the company that built the Sampoong Department Store.

== History ==
The Yoido Full Gospel Church was founded in 1958 by Pastor David Yonggi Cho and his mother-in-law, Choi Ja-shil, both Assemblies of God pastors. On 15 May 1958, a worship service was held in the home of Choi Ja-shil. Apart from the two pastors, only Choi Ja-shil's three daughters (one of whom later married David Yungi Cho) and one elderly woman, who had come in to escape from the rain, attended the first service. The two pastors began a vigorous campaign of knocking on doors, providing spiritual and humanitarian help to the poor, and praying for the sick. Within months, the church had grown to fifty members, too many to accommodate in Choi Ja-shil's living room. Worship services were accordingly moved to a tent pitched in her backyard. As the church continued to grow over the following months and years, the church outgrew one tent after another.

Pastor Cho began preaching on the Three-Fold Blessing (the blessing of the spirit, soul, and body), proclaiming that physical health and financial prosperity are as much a part of God's will for Christians as the salvation of the soul. Inspired by his message of hope and monetary wealth, many previously uncommitted people joined the church, and by the beginning of 1961, membership had grown to a thousand. Having grown too large for its tent, the church purchased its first plot of land, at Seodaemun.

=== The Seodaemun Church: 1961–1973 ===
The church's plans for expansion suffered a setback when Pastor Cho was called up for mandatory military service. Fortunately for the church, he was assigned to an American Army base near Seoul, allowing him to continue with his Sunday preaching, with the help of John Hurston, an American missionary. Cho's spell in the army was short, as ill-health required a major operation and a subsequent discharge from the army. Although ill, Cho continued to pastor the church, and on 15 October 1961, an inaugural service was held in the new auditorium that had been built on the plot of land the church had purchased at Seodaemun. It was named the Full Gospel Revival Center.

Church membership continued to grow, reaching three thousand by 1964 and eight thousand by 1968. Cho continued to be plagued by ill health, and he suffered a physical collapse while leading a baptismal service one Sunday. In 1967, Cho decided to restructure the church. Cho divided the city of Seoul into zones, with church members in each zone comprising a "cell" that would meet on a weekday for worship and Bible study in the home of a "cell leader." Cell members were encouraged to invite their friends to attend cell meetings to learn about Jesus Christ. Each cell leader was instructed to train an assistant. When cell membership reached a certain number, it would be divided, with about half of its members joining the new cell led by the person who had been the assistant.

Cho believed that women would make ideal cell leaders, having both the time and the desire to make home visits to other members, something that many men, for reasons pertaining to Korean culture as it was at that time, were unwilling to do. His decision to appoint women as cell leaders went against the grain of Korean culture, which at that time was not open to the idea of women leading groups that had male members. He persisted, and the cell concept turned out to be an outstanding success. From 125 cells in 1967, the church has grown to several thousand cells in 2015.

Aside from restructuring as a cell-based church, a Women's Fellowship was started in 1960, followed by a Men's Fellowship in 1963, to enable lay members to serve the church in a wide range of volunteer capacities.

Membership continued to grow rapidly, reaching ten thousand in the early 1970s. Having outgrown its Seodaemun premises, the church began looking for a new place to build.

=== The Yoido Church: 1973–present ===
Yeouido (Yoi Island), in the middle of the Han River which winds its way through the heart of Seoul, was at that time little more than sand dunes, without even a bridge to connect it to the city of Seoul. Believing that he had heard from God, Cho and the other leaders of the church decided to purchase a plot of land on Yoi Island, directly across from Korea's National Assembly. Economic problems, including the 1973 "oil shock," which led to spiraling inflation and the loss of jobs for many church members, delayed construction of the new auditorium. However, it was finally finished in 1973, and its inaugural worship service in the auditorium of 12,000 seats was held on 19 August of that year. A month later, Full Gospel Central Church, as it was now known, hosted the 10th Pentecostal World Conference at the Hyochang Stadium.

Membership of Full Gospel Central Church reached fifty thousand by 1977, a figure that doubled in only two years. A special worship service was held to celebrate this milestone, with Demos Shakarian, President of the Full Gospel Businessmen's Fellowship International as the guest speaker.

Beginning in the 1980s, Full Gospel Central Church decided to establish satellite churches throughout the city of Seoul and further afield, as it would not be able to keep on expanding indefinitely. Despite the expansion of the auditorium to seat 12,000 in 1983, seven Sunday services were insufficient to accommodate the entire membership. In 1993, with 700,000 members, the Yoido Full Gospel Church, was the world's largest congregation recognized by the Guinness Book of World Records. Despite the drain of members to the satellite churches, however, new recruits by the mother church – brought in through the vast cell network – have made up for the losses, and membership stood at 780,000 in 2003. The church was renamed Yoido Full Gospel Church in the 1990s. Its founder, Mr David Yonggi Cho, retired as head pastor several times, but the church ran into immediate infighting among the remaining ministers, causing him to come out of retirement, most recently late in 2006. As of 2007, membership stands at 830,000, with seven Sunday services translated into 16 languages.

On 9 January 2009 a Sunday church service was featured in a BBC documentary Around the World in 80 Faiths.

In 2008, Young Hoon Lee became senior pastor.

In 2025, the Church had 480,000 people in Seoul.

== Ministries of the church ==
Yoido Full Gospel Church has established many ministries as part of its outreach program, both locally and internationally. A representative sample of them follows:

- In March 1973, the Osanri Choi Ja-sil Memorial Fasting Prayer Mountain was founded. It has over 200 prayer grottoes in which people may lock themselves to fast and pray, Prayer Mountain now receives more than a million visitors a year, including some 50,000 foreigners.
- In November 1976, Church Growth International, an organization dedicated to teaching the principles of evangelism and church growth to pastors all over the world, was established.
- A ten-story World Evangelical Center, an educational institution attached to the church, was opened on 20 January 1977.
- A television studio, opened on 31 December 1981, was built to broadcast the worship services both nationally and internationally.
- The Full Gospel Educational Research Institute, now the International Theological Institute, was created to promote evangelism and theological training.
- In January 1986, Elim Welfare Town, a facility for the elderly, the young, the homeless, and the unemployed, was set up under the auspices of the church. The latter would be given training and a choice of four occupations. In March of the same year, the church established Hansei University.
- Since 2012, anticipating that the low birthrate issue would escalate into a national crisis, the church took immediate action by implementing measures to address it. As the first in the Korean church community, they began providing childbirth incentives to members who had children, distributing a total of 5.4 billion won up until last year. Starting in 2024, the church has increased the incentives, offering 2 million won for the first child, 3 million won for the second, 5 million won for the third, and 10 million won for the fourth child and beyond.
- In 2024, as Yoido Full Gospel Church celebrates its 66th anniversary, it has appointed its first six female elders. Following the church's ongoing efforts to strengthen the role of women, this comes after the appointment of female pastors in 2023. Now, women are being given the opportunity to participate in the church's leadership as elders, representing the laity in church administration.
- Yeouido Full Gospel Church has proclaimed special prayer meetings and early morning prayer gatherings during critical moments in South Korea's modern history, overcoming challenges through the collective prayers of its congregation.

=== Overseas mission work ===
Yoido Full Gospel Church has sent missionaries to countries worldwide, spreading the "Fivefold Gospel," "Triple Blessing," and the Holy Spirit movement. Overseas missions officially began in 1964 with Pastor Cho Yong-gi's mission work in the United States and have since expanded across continents. Today, the church has sent 657 missionaries to 63 countries, establishing 1,218 churches and guiding over 140,000 people in faith.

== Controversies ==
=== David Yonggi Cho's affair allegations ===
In November 2013, the Church Reform Prayer Meeting exposed allegations of an affair involving David Yonggi Cho, revealing that Cho had allegedly given 1.5 billion won to Jeong Gwi-sun, author of the novel Butterfly Lady of Paris, as hush money. Despite forming a 'Church Investigation Committee,' the inquiry did not address the affair allegations, leaving many questions unanswered. Jeong Gwi-sun, identified as the alleged mistress, supported David Yonggi Cho. In January 2014, Jeong Gwi-sun claimed that the controversial book was fictional and unrelated to Cho, and sued six elders from the prayer meeting. On February 14, Jeong Gwi-sun publicly apologized to the Korean church, Yoido Full Gospel Church, Rev. Cho, and its members for the controversy.

=== Embezzlement charges ===
On 20 February 2014 Pastor Cho and his son (Hee-jun) were convicted of embezzling US$12 million in church funds. The presiding judge once told Cho, "We know that this case is not your problem. You just need to blame it on your son, then you will have no responsibilities," Cho wrote, adding that Cho refused, "My son can be unrighteous to me, but I cannot be unrighteous to my son." In June 2016, this incident became a non-prosecution because there was "no suspicion."

=== Support for Pastor Jeon Kwang-hoon ===
Young Hoon Lee, who has served as the senior pastor of Yoido Full Gospel Church since 2008, sparked controversy on May 16, 2023, when he attended the opening ceremony of the Liberty Korea Party's headquarters in Yeongdeungpo-gu, Seoul. During the event, he urged attendees to support the ultra-right politician Jeon Kwang-hoon who is the pastor of SarangJeil Church in his call to "eradicate communist reds," a phrase now regarded as outdated propaganda. The controversy is heightened by the fact that Jeon, whom Pastor Lee supported, has previously made statements like "God, Freeze!" which are seen as blasphemous by the Christian community. Additionally, Jeon has already been labeled a "heretic" by mainstream Protestant groups in South Korea. The incident has drawn criticism, as it appears that the leader of Korea's largest church is publicly endorsing a figure deemed heretical by many within the faith.

== See also ==
- Christianity in Korea – an overview of the history and social impact of Christianity in Korea
- List of the largest evangelical churches
- List of the largest evangelical church auditoriums
