= Choi Ja-shil =

Korean Pentecostal pastor

- Born: Choi Ja-shil; 25 August 1915; Hwanghae Province, Korea
- Died: 8 November 1989 (aged 74); Los Angeles
- Education: Full Gospel Bible College
- Occupation: Evangelist
- Religion: Christianity (Pentecostal)
- Congregations served: Yoido Full Gospel Church

Korean name
- Hangul: 최자실
- Hanja: 崔子實
- RR: Choe Jasil
- MR: Ch'oe Chasil

Choi Ja-shil or Choi Ja-sil (Korean: 최자실; 25 August 1915 – 8 November 1989) was a Korean pentecostal pastor. She and her future son-in-law, Cho Yong-gi, founded the Yoido Full Gospel Church.

== Biography ==
Choi was born in 1915 in Hwanghae Province, in what is now part of North Korea. As her father died when she was young, Choi assisted her mother in her sewing business to earn an income for the family. When she was twelve years old, Choi and her mother attended the tent revival meeting led by the holiness preacher Lee Sung-Bong and became a Christian. She pursued education in nursing and, after moving to Seoul, started a new business. Despite her successes, Choi suffered the death of her mother and eldest daughter within a week and a half of one another, as well as the failure of her business. Under these stresses, Choi attempted to commit suicide in 1956. During this desperate time, she heard Lee Sung-Bong was leading another revival meeting. She went to the meeting and had a spiritual encounter, committing to enter Full Gospel Bible College to be trained as a great woman evangelist.

When she was in seminary, she met Cho Yong-gi, her future son-in-law. After Choi and Cho graduated in 1958, they started a tent church with the two of them and Choi's three children. This would eventually grow to become the largest church in the world, the Yoido Full Gospel Church. From the early stage of the church, Choi visited and cared for the poor, the sick, and the demon-possessed. She also became known for her ministry of prayer and fasting, and wrote a number of books on the topic.

Choi died of a heart attack on 8 November 1989 in Los Angeles, when she was attending a revival meeting. Yoido Full Gospel Church dedicated one of their facilities for prayer the Osanri Choi Jashil Memorial Fasting Prayer Mountain.

== Works ==
- Choi, Jashil (1978). Korean miracles. Seoul: Young San Publications.
- Choi, Jashil (2009). Hallelujah Lady. Seoul: Seoul Logos.
