= Duilio Arigoni =

Swiss chemist (1928–2020)

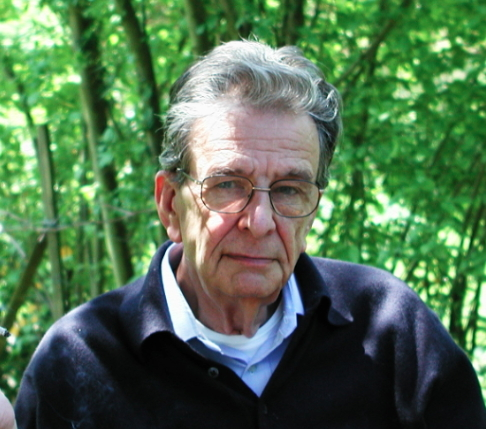
- Born: 6 December 1928; Lugano, Switzerland
- Died: 10 June 2020 (aged 91)
- Education: ETH Zurich
- Awards: Wolf Prize in Chemistry (1989)
- Scientific career
- Fields: Chemistry
- Workplaces: ETH Zurich
- Thesis: Über konfigurative Beziehungen Steroid- und Terpenverbindungen (1955)
- Doctoral advisor: Oskar Jeger & Leopold Ružička
- Notable students: Orlando D. Schärer

Duilio Arigoni (6 December 1928 – 10 June 2020) was a Swiss chemist and Emeritus Professor at ETH Zurich. He worked on the biosynthetic pathways of many organic natural substances.

== Birth and education ==
Born in Lugano, Switzerland, Arigoni completed his undergraduate studies in chemistry at the ETH Zürich in 1951. He completed his Ph.D. in Chemistry from the ETH Zurich in 1955. His doctoral thesis was “Über konfigurative Beziehungen Steroid- und Terpenverbindungen”.

== Academic career ==
After completing his PhD, he became a professor at the ETH Zurich. He was also a visiting professor at Harvard University and Cambridge University. He worked as a professor at ETH Zurich for over fifty years.

== Research ==
Arigoni is known for his research in bio-organic stereochemistry. His major contributions are in the stereochemistry of enzyme-catalyzed reactions and in the biosynthesis of terpenes, alkaloids, and enzyme cofactors. He has explored the detailed stereochemical pathways by which enzymes convert their substrates into products. His strategy of penetrating into the structure of enzyme-substrate interactions by concentrating on the detailed stereochemical fate of isotopic substrate labels, led him to make basic contributions to the mechanism of enzymic reactions requiring coenzyme B12, one of the 'pigments of life'.

== Awards ==
Arigoni received numerous awards. In 1989, he was awarded the Wolf Prize in Chemistry along with Alan R. Battersby of the University of Cambridge "for their fundamental contributions to the elucidation of the mechanism of enzymic reactions and of the biosynthesis of natural products, in particular the pigments of life". He was elected a Foreign Honorary Member of the American Academy of Arts and Sciences in 1988.

Some other awards he has received are:

- Award and Silver Medal, ETH Zürich (1955)
- Werner-Award, Swiss Chemical Society (1960)
- Ruzicka-Award, ETH Zürich (1961)
- Piria-Medal, Italian Chemical Society (1962)
- Ernest Guenther Award, American Chemical Society (1970)
- Cannizzaro-Award, Accademia dei Lincei, Roma (1971)
- Flintoff Medal, Royal Society of Chemistry, London, UK (1981)
- Davy Medal, the Royal Society, London, UK (1983)
- Robert Robinson Medal, Royal Society of Chemistry, UK (1984)
- Welch Award in Chemistry, Robert A. Welch Foundation, Houston, Texas, USA (1985)
- Arthur C. Cope Award, American Chemical Society, USA (1986)
- Paul Karrer Gold Medal, University of Zürich (1989)
- Quilico-Medal, Italian Chemical Society (1992)
- Marcel Benoist Prize, Switzerland (1992)
