= Kukmin Ilbo =

South Korean daily newspaper

Kukmin Ilbo 국민일보
- Type: Daily newspaper
- Format: Print, online
- Owner: Kookmin Ilbo
- Founder: David Yonggi Cho
- Publisher: Kim Sung-ki
- Founded: December 10, 1988
- Language: Korean
- Headquarters: Seoul, South Korea
- Website: www.kmib.co.kr/

Korean name
- Hangul: 국민일보
- Hanja: 國民日報
- RR: Gungmin ilbo
- MR: Kungmin ilbo

Kukmin Ilbo (Korean: 국민일보) is a South Korean daily newspaper published by The Kukmin Ilbo in Seoul, South Korea. In South Korea, "Kukmin" means "nation people". It is headquartered in Yeouido-dong, Yeongdeungpo District, Seoul.

Kukmin Ilbo is officially a media aimed at Christian values. The newspaper is a "centrist" media outlet, but there has been an anti-LGBT controversy, so some reporters inside are insisting on reform of the newspaper's constitution.

== History ==
The newspaper was founded by David Yonggi Cho in 1988.

== Controversies ==
In November 2011, the newspaper's CEO, Cho Hee-jun, was indicted on embezzlement charges and misuse of the newspaper's funds. In February 2014, he was sentenced to 3 years in prison.
