= Yong Hoon Lee =

South Korean academic

President of UNIST, South Korea
- In office 2019–2024

Personal details
- Born: 12 July 1955 (age 71) South Korea
- Education: Seoul National University, University of Pennsylvania, USA
- Profession: University president, electrical engineer
- Scientific career
- Education: Seoul National University, University of Pennsylvania, USA
- Fields: Signal processing
- Workplaces: KAIST, UNIST
- Thesis: (1984)

Korean name
- Hangul: 이용훈
- RR: I Yonghun
- MR: I Yonghun

Yong Hoon Lee (born 12 July 1955) was the President of Ulsan National Institute of Science and Technology, South Korea. He is an electrical engineer specializing in wireless communications and signal processing.

== Early life ==
Lee received his bachelor's and master's degree in electrical and computer engineering from Seoul National University, Korea in 1978 and 1980 respectively. In 1984, Lee received his Ph.D. degree in electrical and computer engineering from the University of Pennsylvania, USA.

== Career ==
From 1984 to 1988, Lee joined the SUNY, Buffalo, NY, as an assistant professor in electrical and computer engineering. In 1989, he joined KAIST as a faculty member. From 2004 to 2005, he became Head of the Electrical Engineering Department. From 2005 to 2011, he became Dean of the College of Engineering. From 2011 to 2013, he became Provost of KAIST. In 2019, Lee became the 4th President of UNIST.

== Awards ==
Lee has received numerous awards, including the distinguished service medal from Institute of Electronics, Korea and the Presidential Citation from the President of South Korea.
