= Hansei University =

Christian university in Gunpo, South Korea

Coordinates: 37.342428°N 126.953838°E

- Motto: Righteousness, Truth, and Love
- Type: Private
- Established: 1953
- Religious affiliation: Yoido Full Gospel Church
- Chancellor: Kim Seong-hye
- President: Kim Sung Hae
- Location: Gunpo, South Korea
- Website: http://www.hansei.ac.kr

- Hansei University
- Hangul: 한세대학교
- Hanja: 韓世大學校
- RR: Hanse daehakgyo
- MR: Hanse taehakkyo

Hansei University (Korean: 한세대학교; Korean pronunciation: [haːn.se]) is a mid-sized Evangelical Christian University located in Gunpo, South Korea. It is affiliated with Yoido Full Gospel Church.

== History ==
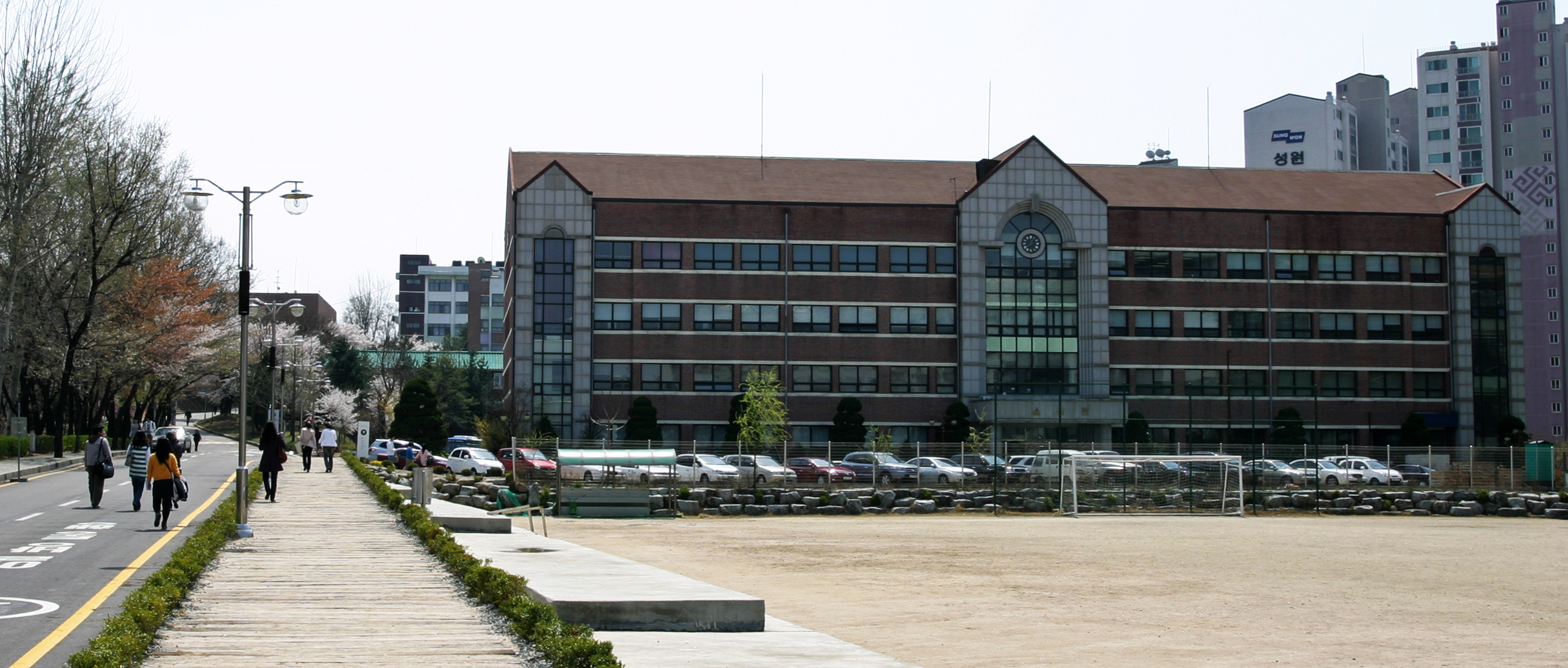
Hansei University Campus, Music Building

In 1953, Assemblies of God missionaries established the Full Gospel Bible College. In 1997, the name was changed to Hansei University and became a fully accredited university by the South Korean government.

== Programs ==
It has currently nine departments: Theology, Media and Communication Arts, Business Administration, Humanities and Social Science, International Language, Information Technology, Art, Design, and Nursing The university is widely recognized especially for choral music. Regarded as one of the top choral music universities in Eastern Asia, Hansei University boasts a choral music faculty of six professor/conductors on top of its 40+ music faculty. The university is planning to open an international school for choral music in 2015/16. Composer Hyo-Won Woo has served on the university's faculty.

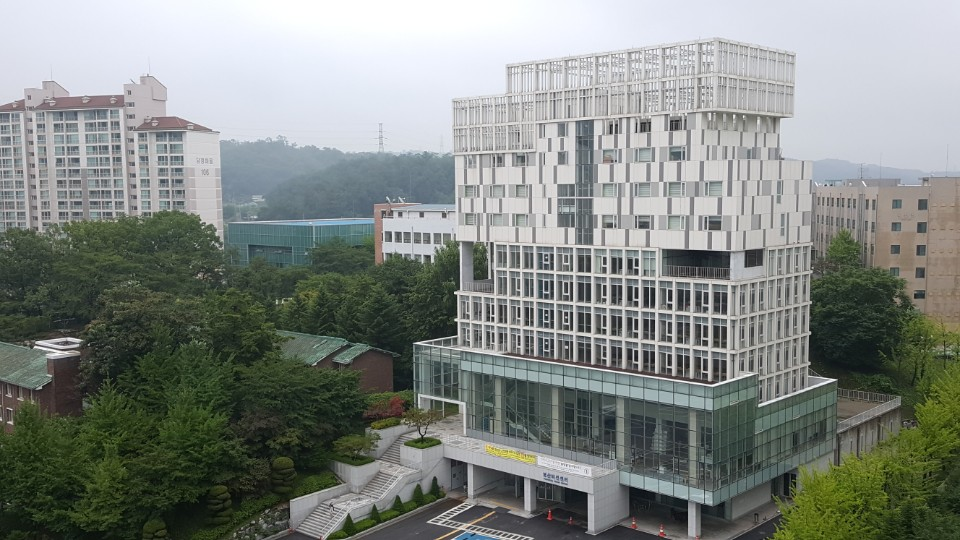
한세대영산비전센터

== Notable alumni ==
- Kim Jong-kook, (Turbo)
- Cho Yong-gi
- Choi Ja-shil

== See also ==
- List of colleges and universities in South Korea
- Education in South Korea
