= Anyang University =

University in Anyang, South Korea

Coordinates: 37°23′30″N 126°55′11″E

- 안양대학교
- Logo
- Motto: Brightening One Corner
- Type: Private
- Established: 1948
- President: Noh-Jun Park
- Students: ~5,500
- Location: Anyang City, Gyeonggi, South Korea
- Campus: Urban
- Colours: Blue and yellow
- Mascot: Mountain goat
- Website: http://www.anyang.ac.kr/eng/

- Anyang University
- Hangul: 안양대학교
- Hanja: 安養大學校
- RR: Anyang daehakgyo
- MR: Anyang taehakkyo

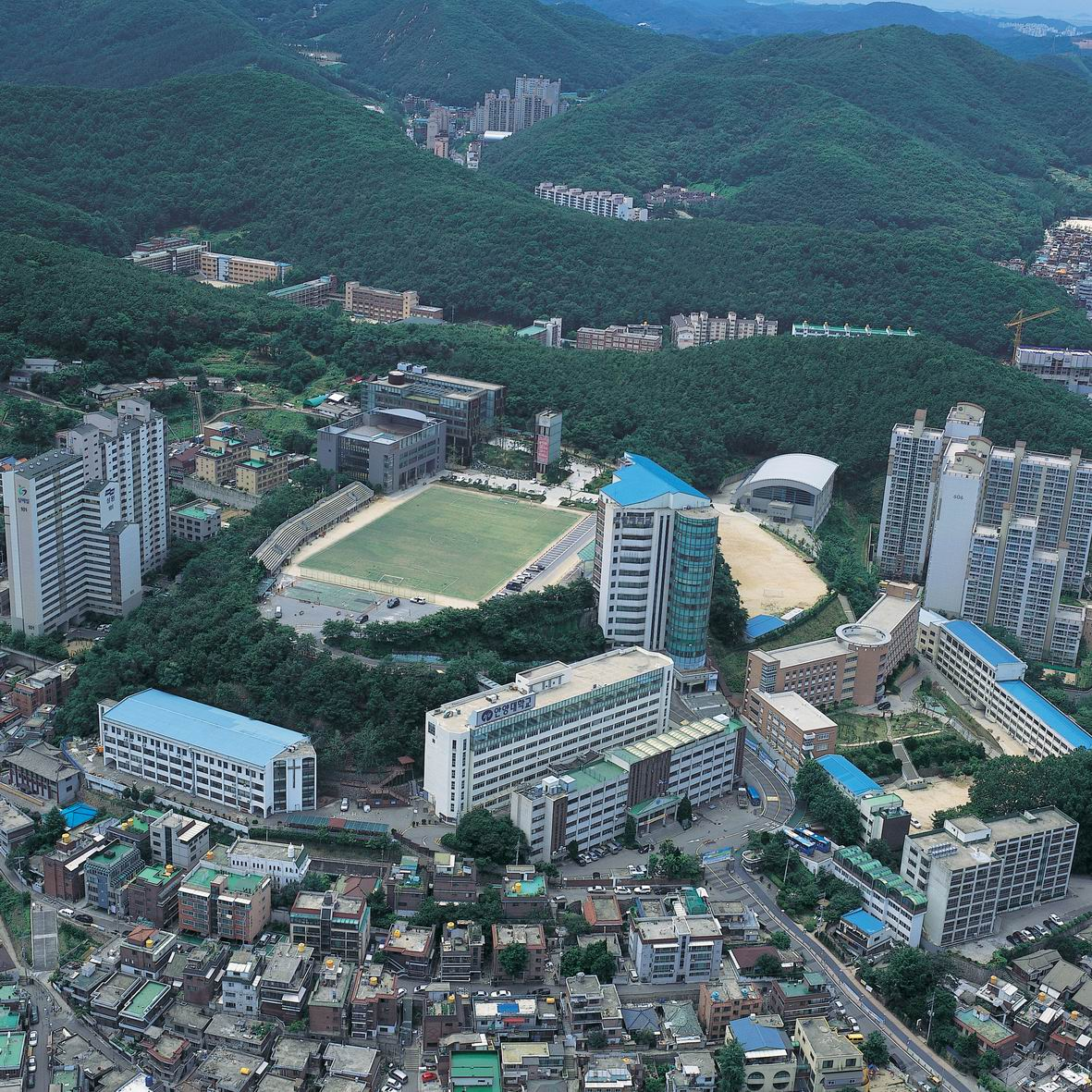
Campus Skyview

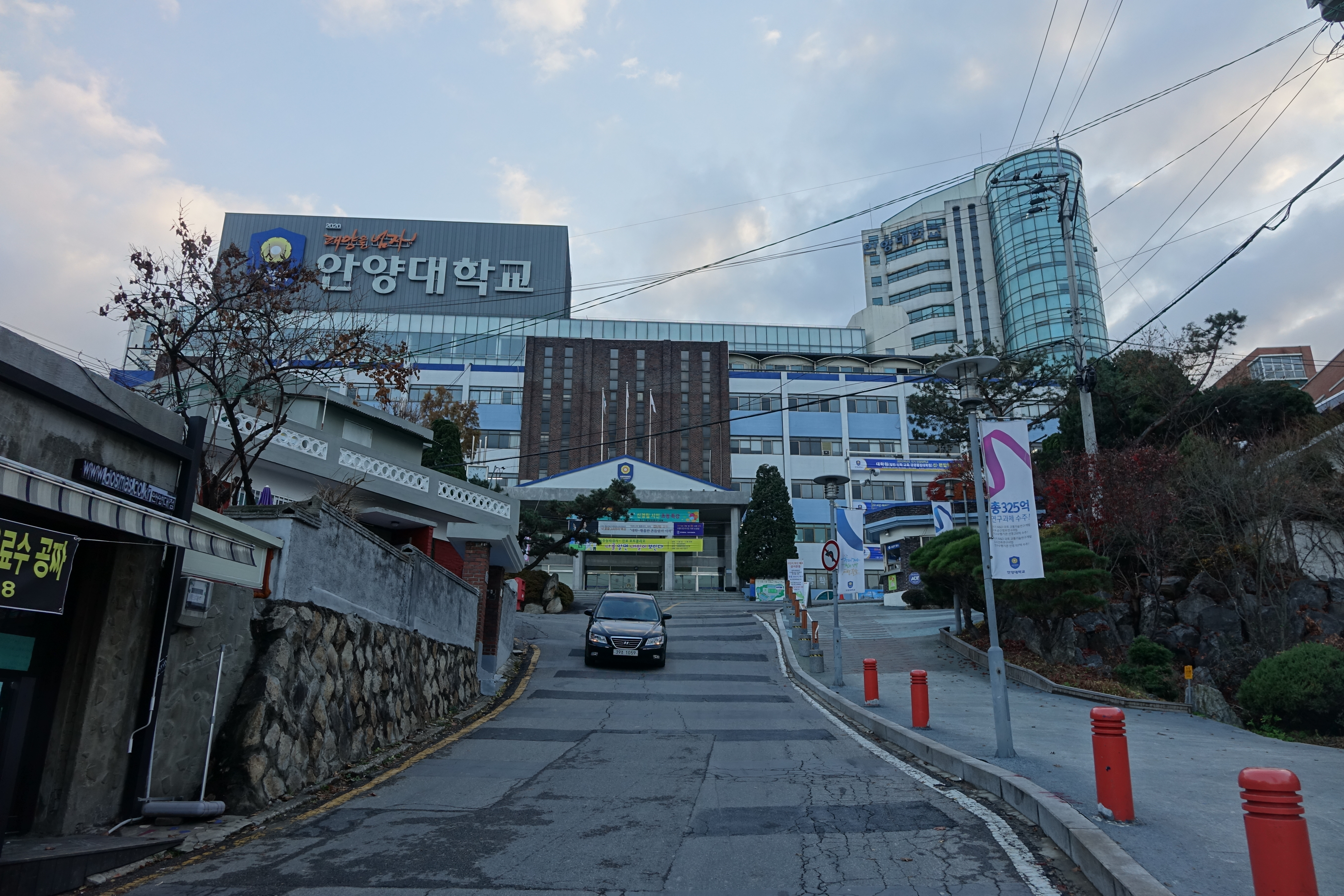
2014년 12월 20일 안양대학교18

Anyang University is a private university in South Korea. The university offers undergraduate, graduate, doctoral and research programs. Its main campus is located in Anyang City, south of Seoul in Gyeonggi province and the second campus is located on Ganghwa Island, Incheon and has a student body of about 5,500. It has colleges of Humanities, Social Sciences, Science & Engineering, Theological Studies, Music, and Liberal Arts & Sciences, and offers graduate programs in General Studies, Theology, Education, and Business Administration & Public Administration.

== History ==
The school opened in 1948 as a theological college in Seoul.

When the campus moved from Seoul to Anyang in 1980s, the school expanded to Liberal Arts and, later, to engineering, technology, and business as well. With such expansion, the school changed its name to "DaeShin University" in 1990, and the current name was adopted in March, 1995. Dr. Youngsil Kim became the first president of the university since its conversion to university system. He was succeeded by Dr. Seung Tae Kim. In June 2014, Dr. Suk-Joon Kim became the president of the university.

== Schools and departments ==
- Undergraduate

College of Humanities
College of Social Science
College of Engineering
College of Theology
College of Music
College of Liberal Arts & Science

- Graduate

General Graduate School
Graduate School of Engineering
Graduate School of Theology
Graduate School of Education
Graduate School of Business & Public Administration

- Departments

Business Administration
Chinese Language
Christian Culture
Christian Education
Computer Science & Engineering
Cosmetology
Digital Media Design
Digital Media Engineering
Early Childhood Education
Electrical & Electronic Engineering
English Linguistics & Literature
Environmental Engineering
Food Science & Nutrition
International Relations
Information & Communications Engineering
Information & Statistics
Korean Linguistics & Literature
Marine Biotechnology
Music (Composition, Instrumental Studies, Piano, Voice)
Performing Arts
Public Administration
Russian Language
Social Welfare
Theology
Tourism English Interpretation
Tourism Management
Trade & Distribution
Urban Administration
Urban Information Engineering

== Resources and institutes ==
- Subsidiary institutions

Academia-Industrial-Research Consortium Center
Anyang University Broadcasting Station(
Anyang University Newspaper (English & Korean)
Anyang University Medical Clinic
Business Incubation Center
Center for Teaching & Learning
Computing & Information Center
Illwoo Central Library
Office of International Relations
Student Human Resources Development Center
Student Life Counseling Center
Student Service Center

- Research institutes

The Brightening One Corner Institute
CReDI Capital Regional Development Institute
The Institute of Humanities Science
The Institute of Social Sciences
The Center for Theological Research
The Institute for Welfare Administration
West Costal Area Development Institute

- Auxiliary educational centers

Lifelong Education Center
Foreign Language Education Center
Wooli Children's Daycare Center

== Scholarships ==
Anyang University offers scholarships for domestic and international students according to matriculation status, school and department affiliation, financial need, academic achievement, and grade point average from its funds, sponsors, and research institutes.

== Campuses ==
- Anyang Campus, 708-113, Anyang-5dong, Manan-gu, Anyang-si, Gyeonggi-do, Korea
- Ganghwa Campus, San102, Samsung-ri, Buleun-myeon, Ganwha-gun, Incheon, Korea

== See also ==
- List of colleges and universities in South Korea
- Education in South Korea
