= Ulsan National Institute of Science and Technology =

Public university in Ulsan, South Korea

Coordinates: 35.573°N 129.190°E

- 울산과학기술원
- Motto: First in Change
- Type: National
- Established: 2007
- Budget: 152 million USD (2015)
- President: Park Chong Rae
- Academic staff: 391 (2016)
- Administrative staff: 288 (2016)
- Undergraduates: 2,377 (2022)
- Postgraduates: 2,138 (2022)
- Location: Ulsan, South Korea
- Colors: UNIST Navy, UNIST Emerald
- Mascot: Uni (윤이) the unicorn
- Website: www.unist.ac.kr

- Ulsan National Institute of Science and Technology
- Hangul: 울산과학기술원 / 울산과기원 / 유니스트
- Hanja: 蔚山科學技術院 / 蔚山科技院 / 유니스트
- Revised Romanization: Ulsan Gwahak Gisurwon / Ulsan Gwagiwon / Yuniseuteu
- McCune–Reischauer: Ulsan Kwahak Kisurwŏn / Ulsan Kwagiwŏn / Yunisŭt'ŭ

Ulsan National Institute of Science and Technology (UNIST; Korean: 울산과학기술원), is one of the four public universities in South Korea which are dedicated to research in science and technology, along with KAIST, GIST, and DGIST. UNIST was founded in 2007 in response to growing demand for higher education in the Korean industrial capital of Ulsan, where automotive (Hyundai Motor), shipbuilding (Hyundai Heavy Industries), petrochemical (SK Energy), and secondary cells industries are clustered. At the time of its foundation, UNIST was known for being the first national university in South Korea to be incorporated and thus administered by an independent board of trustees despite being funded by the central government.

== History ==
Despite the fact that Ulsan, with over 1.1 million residents, is an industrial powerhouse of South Korea with the highest GDP per capita among any region in the country, there only existed one university within the city limits, the University of Ulsan. The former president Roh Mu-hyun included the establishment of a national university in Ulsan as part of his campaigning platform and a discussion regarding the university began three years into his presidency along with the construction of a new high speed rail station, Ulsan Station, for the city.

The location of the campus was finalized in 2006 and in 2007, Moo Je Cho was selected as the first president of the new university. Cho appealed to the public that the school should be a science and technology oriented institute in order for the new school to find its niche and to take advantage of a possible synergetic effect resulting from a collaboration between the researchers and the local industry as seen in the case of Stanford University and Silicon Valley or KAIST and Daedeock Innopolis.

UNIST was established by the UNIST bill that was passed in 2007 by the request of the people and city of Ulsan. In 2009, UNIST opened its doors to welcome its first class of undergraduate students.

In March 2015, a new bill was passed in the national assembly recognizing UNIST as one of the four nationally funded research institutes in Korea. Besides changing the Korean name of the school from Ulsan Gwahak Gisurdae (울산과학기술대) to Ulsan Gwahak Gisurwon (울산과학기술원), the passage of this bill implied a new set of additional changes and benefits from the national government including but not limited to a greater emphasis on graduate education and the waiver of the alternative military service examination for its PhD students.

On 12 May 2019, the university has celebrated its 10th anniversary from the day of its opening. The ceremony lasted the entire day, and several UNIST members and distinguished guests, such as National Assembly members Lee Chae-ik, Jeong Kab-yoon, and Kang Ghil-boo, Ulju County mayor Lee Seon-ho, among others. The ceremony was sponsored by KBS and BNK Kyongnam Bank. A commemorative open concert was held in the evening of the same day and was broadcast via Korean Broadcasting Service. The concert was attended by some 7000 people.

=== Timeline ===
April 6, 2007	The Act on Establishment and Operation of the National University Corporation, Ulsan National Institute of Science and Technology was enacted.
September 1, 2007	The first president, Cho Moo Je, was appointed
October 10, 2007	The first board of directors meeting was held
March 2, 2009	The first undergraduate students were accepted
June 2010	UNIST Supercomputing center opened
September 1, 2011	President Cho started his second term
October 7, 2012	The first Institute for Basic Science (IBS) lab opened.
October 18, 2012	The stem cell research building opened
February 26, 2013	The first graduation ceremony took place
February 27, 2013	The 5th class entrance ceremony was held
July 1, 2014	The Genomics Institute opened
September 2015	UNIST becomes one of the fourth nationally funded research institutes in Korea
October 2015	Inauguration of Jung Mooyoung as the 3rd president of the school took place.
December 7, 2015	Inauguration of the institute of disaster management took place.
March 7, 2017	UNIST opens Industry-Academia Battery R&D Center, said to be the world's largest R&D center for batteries operated by a university.
March 23, 2018	Completion of the Ulsan Industry-University Convergence Center, UNIST's second campus.
November 26, 2018	UNIST receives the AACSB (Association to Advance Collegiate Schools of Business) International Accreditation.
November 25, 2019	Lee Yong Hoon begins his term as UNIST's 4th president.
June 8, 2024	Park Chong Rae becomes the 5th president of UNIST.

== University rankings ==
University rankings
QS National	General	8
THE National	General	7
ARWU National	Research	7–9
QS Asia (Asia version)	General	88
THE Asia (Asia version)	General	=38
USNWR Asia	General	94
ARWU World	Research	301–400
QS World	General	=310
THE World	General	201–250
USNWR World	General	=403
THE World (Young)	General/Young	10

In 2017, the Times Higher Education ranked UNIST 201-250th in the world.

In 2018, the Times Higher Education ranked UNIST 201-250th in the world.

In 2019, the U.S. News & World Report Best Global University Ranking ranked UNIST 368th in the world, 51st in Asia, 7th in Korea. Times Higher Education World University Rankings ranked UNIST 201-250th in the world, 20th amongst world's youngest universities (Universities that are 50 years old or younger), and 22nd best university in Asia.

In 2021, the Times Higher Education ranked UNIST 178th in the world, 21st in Asia, 5th in Korea, 5th amongst world’s youngest universities.

== Academics ==
UNIST is a medium-sized, research oriented university. Modeled after other universities around the world such as KAIST, MIT and HKUST the school employed three approaches that would set UNIST apart from other universities in Korea. First, despite being a national university of Korea, 100% of the courses at UNIST are taught in English and the school is actively seeking ways to recruit international students and professors. Second, all undergraduate students are required to pursue two areas of specializations called 'tracks'. The first track is roughly equivalent to a major and the second track is comparable to a minor at other universities. Third, UNIST has adopted the flipped learning approach in its classrooms in order to promote active student participation and mastery of the core subjects in science and engineering.

UNIST comprises 13 science and engineering departments, a business school, and the School of Liberal Arts, which oversees the school's first year undergraduate curriculum. In addition, there are several specialized graduate schools and research centers.

=== Undergraduate schools ===
- Department of Mechanical Engineering
- Department of Urban and Environmental Engineering
- Department of Materials Science and Engineering
- Department of Nuclear Engineering
- School of Design
- School of Biomedical Engineering
- Department of Industrial Engineering
- Department of Biological Engineering
- Department of Electrical Engineering
- Department of Computer Science and Engineering
- Department of Physics
- Department of Mathematical Science
- Department of Chemistry
- School of Energy and Chemical Engineering
- School of Business Administration
- School of Liberal Arts

=== Graduate schools ===
- Graduate School of Technology & Innovation Management
- Graduate School of Creative Design Engineering
- Graduate School of Interdisciplinary Management
- Graduate School of Artificial Intelligence
- Graduate School of Semiconductor Materials and Devices Engineering

=== Affiliated research centers ===
- KOGIC: Korean Genomics Center at UNIST
- Hans Schöler Stem Cell Research Center
- Institute for Basic Science (IBS) is a nationally funded research organization in South Korea consisting of a number of labs in universities around the country. UNIST is home to 3 IBS affiliated labs, namely:
  1. Center for Multidimensional Carbon Materials (Director Rodney Ruoff)
  2. Center for Soft and Living Matter (Director Steve Granick)
  3. Center for Genomic Integrity (Director Myung Kyungjae)

== Campus ==
UNIST maintains a fully residential campus. Its location, Eonyang, is adjacent to the old Ulsan city and small mountains surround the whole campus. At the center of the campus, there sits a large man-made pond called Gamakmot.

== Note ==
- All courses are taught in English.
- Almost all students live in dormitories.
- All undergraduate students and graduate students in good standing receive full-tuition and living expenses from the university.
- UNIST is actively recruiting international researchers and graduate level students.

== Gallery ==
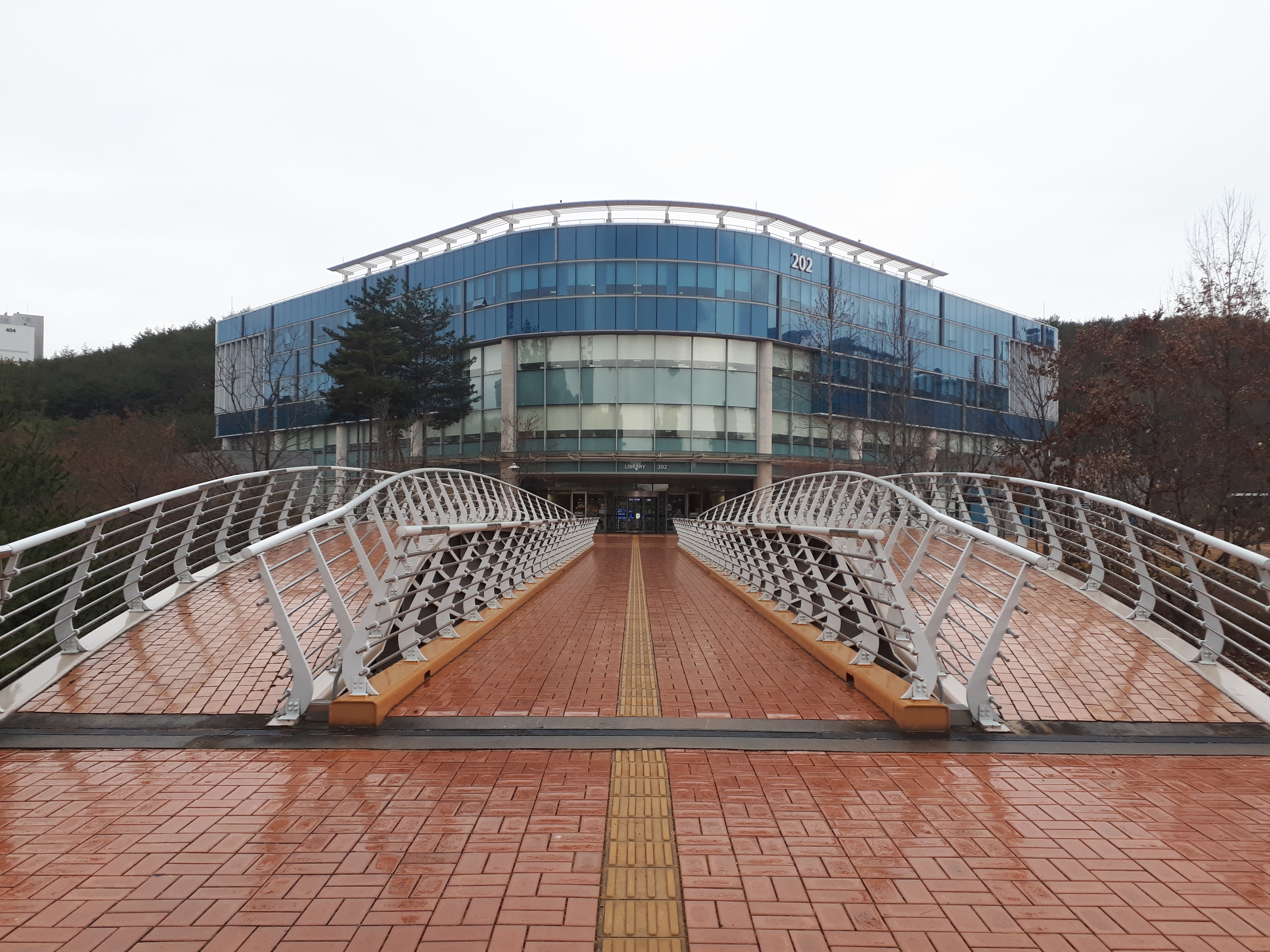
UNIST Library

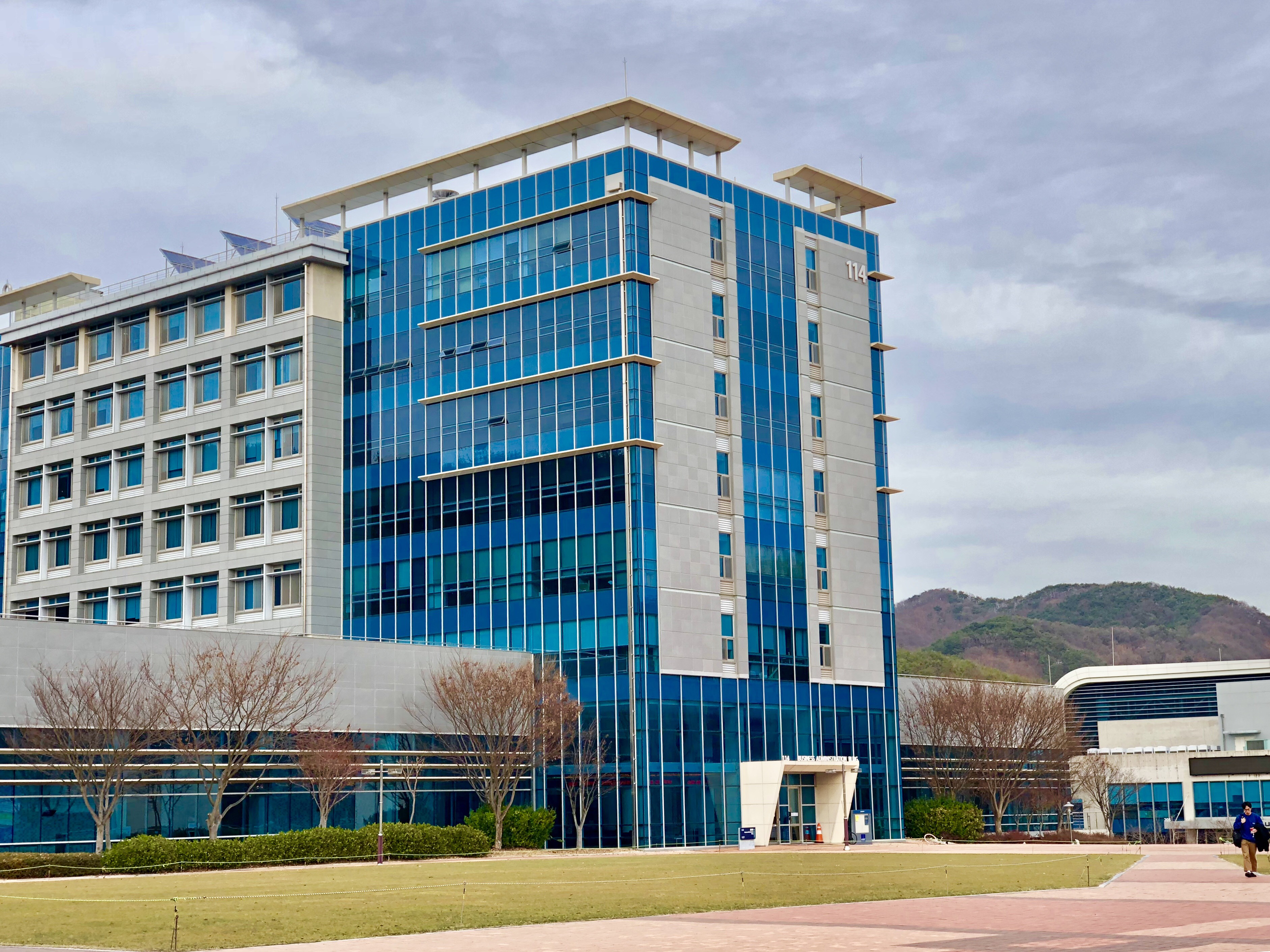
Business Administration Building

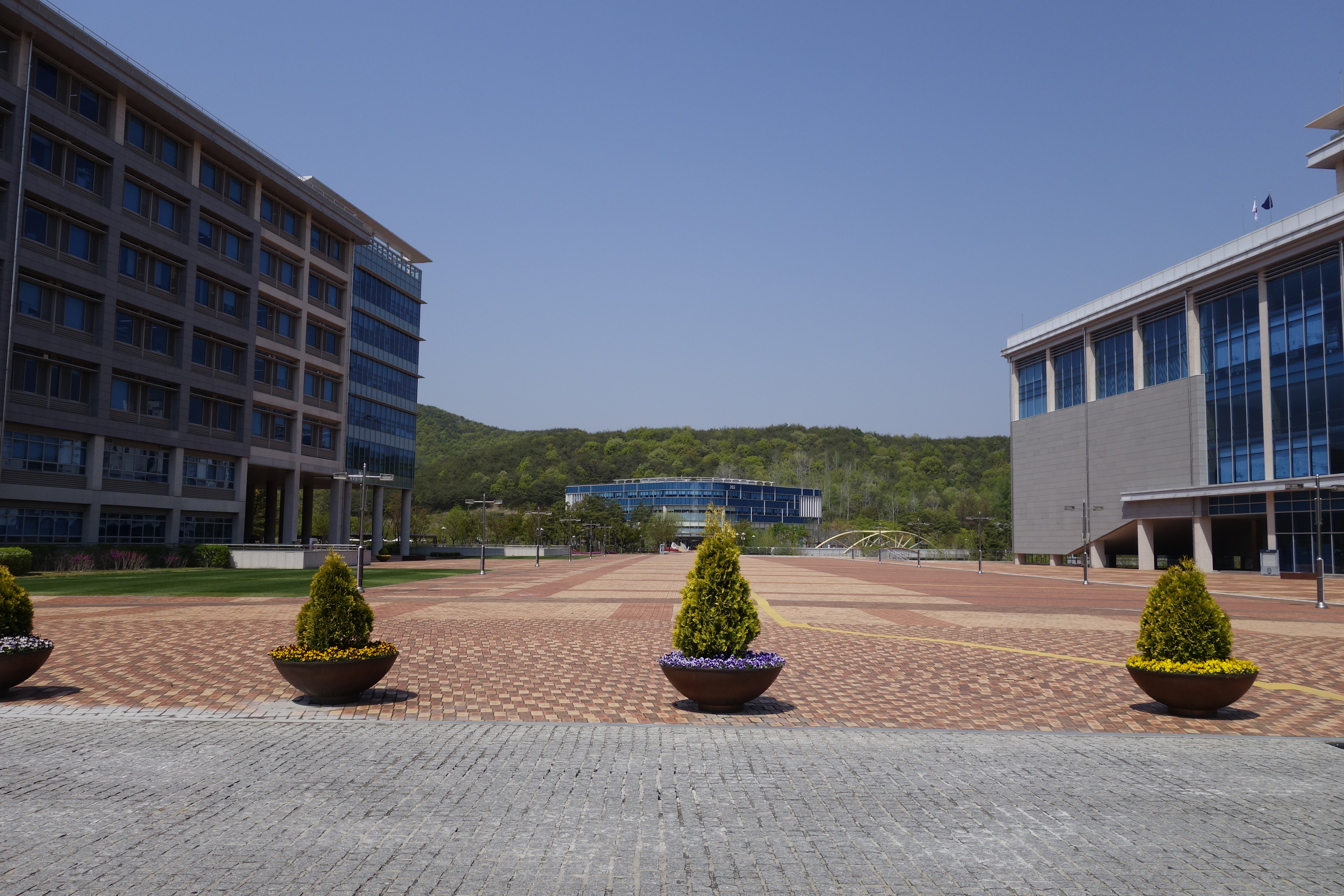
View from the main entrance

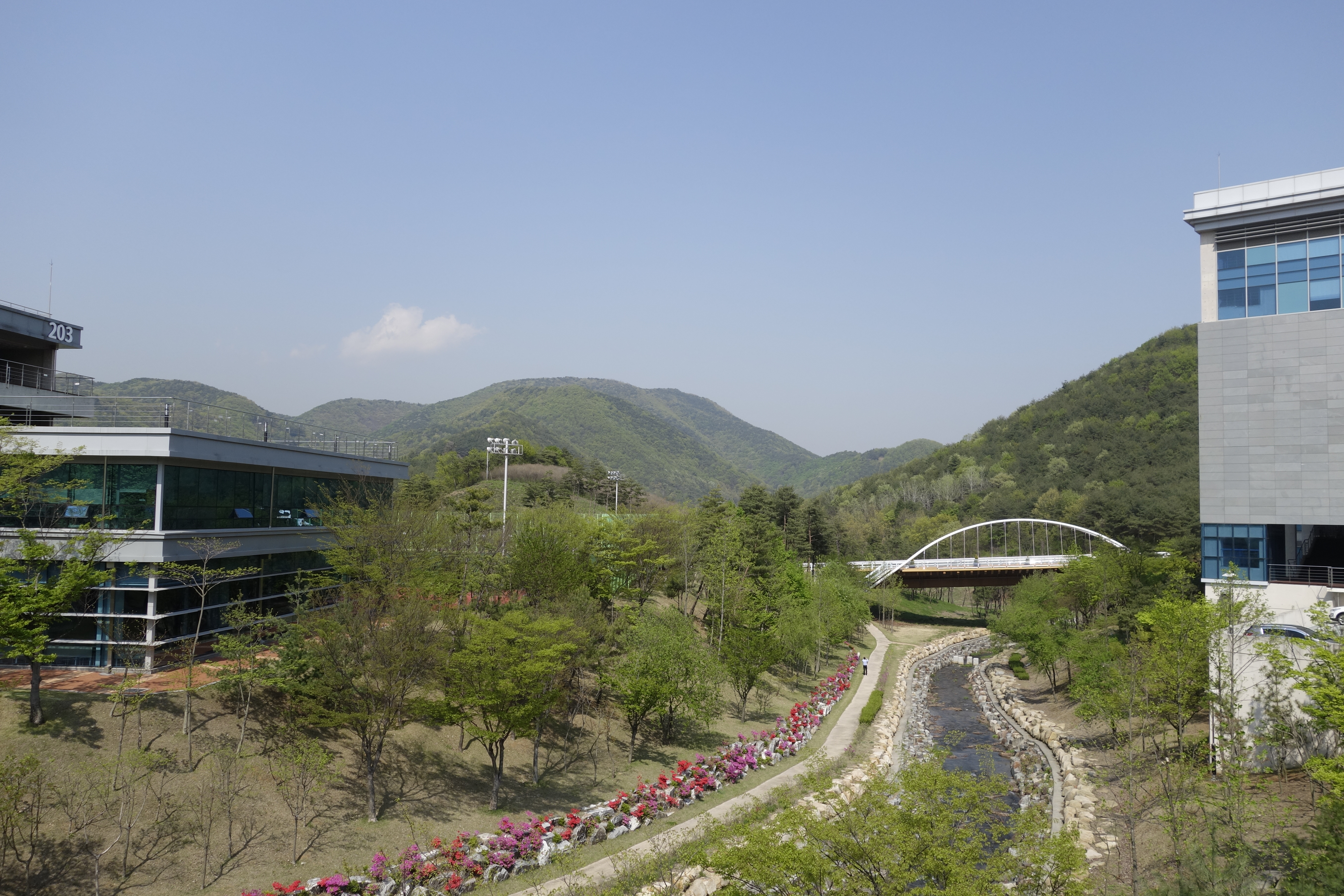
View from the main square to the north

== See also ==
- List of national universities in South Korea
- List of universities and colleges in South Korea
- Education in South Korea
