= Silver nanoparticle =

Ultrafine particles of silver between 1 nm and 100 nm in size

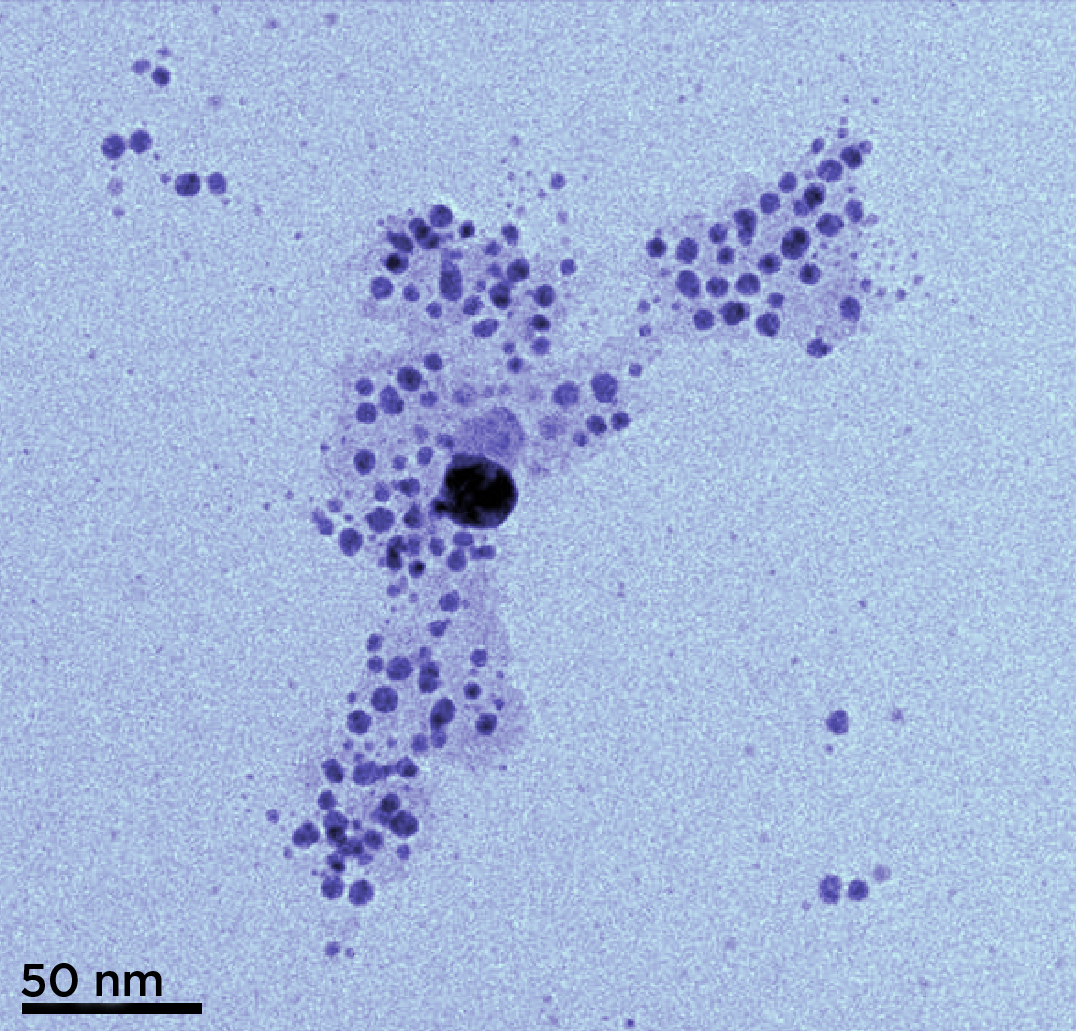
Electron micrograph of silver nanoparticles

Silver nanoparticles are nanoparticles of silver of between 1 nm and 100 nm in size. While frequently described as being 'silver' some are composed of a large percentage of silver oxide due to their large ratio of surface to bulk silver atoms. Numerous shapes of nanoparticles can be constructed depending on the application at hand. Commonly used silver nanoparticles are spherical, but diamond, octagonal, and thin sheets are also common. It is typically used as a colloid, hence the name colloidal silver.

Their extremely large surface area permits the coordination of a vast number of ligands. The properties of silver nanoparticles applicable to human treatments are under investigation in laboratory and animal studies, assessing potential efficacy, biosafety, and biodistribution.

== Synthesis methods ==
=== Wet chemistry ===
The most common methods for nanoparticle synthesis fall under the category of wet chemistry, or the nucleation of particles within a solution. This nucleation occurs when a silver ion complex, usually AgNO_{3} or AgClO_{4}, is reduced to colloidal Ag in the presence of a reducing agent. When the concentration increases enough, dissolved metallic silver ions bind together to form a stable surface. The surface is energetically unfavorable when the cluster is small, because the energy gained by decreasing the concentration of dissolved particles is not as high as the energy lost from creating a new surface. When the cluster reaches a certain size, known as the critical radius, it becomes energetically favorable, and thus stable enough to continue to grow. This nucleus then remains in the system and grows as more silver atoms diffuse through the solution and attach to the surface When the dissolved concentration of atomic silver decreases enough, it is no longer possible for enough atoms to bind together to form a stable nucleus. At this nucleation threshold, new nanoparticles stop being formed, and the remaining dissolved silver is absorbed by diffusion into the growing nanoparticles in the solution.

As the particles grow, other molecules in the solution diffuse and attach to the surface. This process stabilizes the surface energy of the particle and blocks new silver ions from reaching the surface. The attachment of these capping/stabilizing agents slows and eventually stops the growth of the particle. The most common capping ligands are trisodium citrate and polyvinylpyrrolidone (PVP), but many others are also used in varying conditions to synthesize particles with particular sizes, shapes, and surface properties.

There are many different wet synthesis methods, including the use of reducing sugars, citrate reduction, reduction via sodium borohydride, the silver mirror reaction, the polyol process, seed-mediated growth, and light-mediated growth. Each of these methods, or a combination of methods, will offer differing degrees of control over the size distribution as well as distributions of geometric arrangements of the nanoparticle.

A new, very promising wet-chemical technique was found by Elsupikhe et al. (2015). They have developed a green ultrasonically-assisted synthesis. Under ultrasound treatment, silver nanoparticles (AgNP) are synthesized with κ-carrageenan as a natural stabilizer. The reaction is performed at ambient temperature and produces silver nanoparticles with fcc crystal structure without impurities. The concentration of κ-carrageenan is used to influence particle size distribution of the AgNPs.

==== Monosaccharide reduction ====
There are many ways silver nanoparticles can be synthesized; one method is through monosaccharides. This includes glucose, fructose, maltose, maltodextrin, etc., but not sucrose. It is also a simple method to reduce silver ions back to silver nanoparticles as it usually involves a one-step process. There have been methods that indicated that these reducing sugars are essential to the formation of silver nanoparticles. Many studies indicated that this method of green synthesis, specifically using Cacumen platycladi extract, enabled the reduction of silver. Additionally, the size of the nanoparticle could be controlled depending on the concentration of the extract. The studies indicate that the higher concentrations correlated to an increased number of nanoparticles. Smaller nanoparticles were formed at high pH levels due to the concentration of the monosaccharides.

Another method of silver nanoparticle synthesis includes the use of reducing sugars with alkali starch and silver nitrate. The reducing sugars have free aldehyde and ketone groups, which enable them to be oxidized into gluconate. The monosaccharide must have a free ketone group because in order to act as a reducing agent it first undergoes tautomerization. In addition, if the aldehydes are bound, it will be stuck in cyclic form and cannot act as a reducing agent. For example, glucose has an aldehyde functional group that is able to reduce silver cations to silver atoms and is then oxidized to gluconic acid. The reaction for the sugars to be oxidized occurs in aqueous solutions. The capping agent is also not present when heated.

==== Citrate reduction ====
An early, and very common, method for synthesizing silver nanoparticles is citrate reduction. This method was first recorded by M. C. Lea, who successfully produced a citrate-stabilized silver colloid in 1889. Citrate reduction involves the reduction of a silver source particle, usually AgNO_{3} or AgClO_{4}, to colloidal silver using trisodium citrate, Na_{3}C_{6}H_{5}O_{7}. The synthesis is usually performed at an elevated temperature (~100 °C) to maximize the monodispersity (uniformity in both size and shape) of the particle. In this method, the citrate ion traditionally acts as both the reducing agent and the capping ligand, making it a useful process for AgNP production due to its relative ease and short reaction time. However, the silver particles formed may exhibit broad size distributions and form several different particle geometries simultaneously. The addition of stronger reducing agents to the reaction is often used to synthesize particles of a more uniform size and shape.

==== Reduction via sodium borohydride ====
The synthesis of silver nanoparticles by sodium borohydride (NaBH_{4}) reduction occurs by the following reaction:

Ag^{+} + BH_{4}^{−} + 3 H_{2}O → Ag^{0} +B(OH)_{3} +3.5 H_{2}

The reduced metal atoms will form nanoparticle nuclei. Overall, this process is similar to the above reduction method using citrate. The benefit of using sodium borohydride is increased monodispersity of the final particle population. The reason for the increased monodispersity when using NaBH_{4} is that it is a stronger reducing agent than citrate. The impact of reducing agent strength can be seen by inspecting a LaMer diagram which describes the nucleation and growth of nanoparticles.

When silver nitrate (AgNO_{3}) is reduced by a weak reducing agent like citrate, the reduction rate is lower which means that new nuclei are forming and old nuclei are growing concurrently. This is the reason that the citrate reaction has low monodispersity. Because NaBH_{4} is a much stronger reducing agent, the concentration of silver nitrate is reduced rapidly which shortens the time during which new nuclei form and grow concurrently yielding a monodispersed population of silver nanoparticles.

Particles formed by reduction must have their surfaces stabilized to prevent undesirable particle agglomeration (when multiple particles bond together), growth, or coarsening. The driving force for these phenomena is the minimization of surface energy (nanoparticles have a large surface to volume ratio). This tendency to reduce surface energy in the system can be counteracted by adding species which will adsorb to the surface of the nanoparticles and lowers the activity of the particle surface thus preventing particle agglomeration according to the DLVO theory and preventing growth by occupying attachment sites for metal atoms. Chemical species that adsorb to the surface of nanoparticles are called ligands. Some of these surface stabilizing species are: NaBH_{4} in large amounts, polyvinylpyrrolidone (PVP), sodium dodecyl sulfate (SDS), and/or dodecanethiol.

Once the particles have been formed in solution they must be separated and collected. There are several general methods to remove nanoparticles from solution, including evaporating the solvent phase or the addition of chemicals to the solution that lower the solubility of the nanoparticles in the solution. Both methods force the precipitation of the nanoparticles.

==== Polyol process ====
The polyol process is a particularly useful method because it yields a high degree of control over both the size and geometry of the resulting nanoparticles. In general, the polyol synthesis begins with the heating of a polyol compound such as ethylene glycol, 1,5-pentanediol, or 1,2-propylene glycol7. An Ag^{+} species and a capping agent are added (although the polyol itself is also often the capping agent). The Ag^{+} species is then reduced by the polyol to colloidal nanoparticles. The polyol process is highly sensitive to reaction conditions such as temperature, chemical environment, and concentration of substrates. Therefore, by changing these variables, various sizes and geometries can be selected for such as quasi-spheres, pyramids, spheres, and wires. Further study has examined the mechanism for this process as well as resulting geometries under various reaction conditions in greater detail.

==== Seed-mediated growth ====
Seed-mediated growth is a synthetic method in which small, stable nuclei are grown in a separate chemical environment to a desired size and shape. Seed-mediated methods consist of two different stages: nucleation and growth. Variation of certain factors in the synthesis (e.g. ligand, nucleation time, reducing agent, etc.), can control the final size and shape of nanoparticles, making seed-mediated growth a popular synthetic approach to controlling morphology of nanoparticles.

The nucleation stage of seed-mediated growth consists of the reduction of metal ions in a precursor to metal atoms. In order to control the size distribution of the seeds, the period of nucleation should be made short for monodispersity. The LaMer model illustrates this concept. Seeds typically consist small nanoparticles, stabilized by a ligand. Ligands are small, usually organic molecules that bind to the surface of particles, preventing seeds from further growth. Ligands are necessary as they increase the energy barrier of coagulation, preventing agglomeration. The balance between attractive and repulsive forces within colloidal solutions can be modeled by DLVO theory. Ligand binding affinity, and selectivity can be used to control shape and growth. For seed synthesis, a ligand with medium to low binding affinity should be chosen as to allow for exchange during growth phase.

The growth of nanoseeds involves placing the seeds into a growth solution. The growth solution requires a low concentration of a metal precursor, ligands that will readily exchange with preexisting seed ligands, and a weak or very low concentration of reducing agent. The reducing agent must not be strong enough to reduce metal precursor in the growth solution in the absence of seeds. Otherwise, the growth solution will form new nucleation sites instead of growing on preexisting ones (seeds). Growth is the result of the competition between surface energy (which increases unfavorably with growth) and bulk energy (which decreases favorably with growth). The balance between the energetics of growth and dissolution is the reason for uniform growth only on preexisting seeds (and no new nucleation). Growth occurs by the addition of metal atoms from the growth solution to the seeds, and ligand exchange between the growth ligands (which have a higher bonding affinity) and the seed ligands.

Range and direction of growth can be controlled by nanoseed, concentration of metal precursor, ligand, and reaction conditions (heat, pressure, etc.). Controlling stoichiometric conditions of growth solution controls ultimate size of particle. For example, a low concentration of metal seeds to metal precursor in the growth solution will produce larger particles. Capping agent has been shown to control direction of growth and thereby shape. Ligands can have varying affinities for binding across a particle. Differential binding within a particle can result in dissimilar growth across particle. This produces anisotropic particles with nonspherical shapes including prisms, cubes, and rods.

==== Light-mediated growth ====
Light-mediated syntheses have also been explored where light can promote formation of various silver nanoparticle morphologies.

==== Silver mirror reaction ====
The silver mirror reaction involves the conversion of silver nitrate to Ag(NH_{3})OH. Ag(NH_{3})OH is subsequently reduced into colloidal silver using an aldehyde containing molecule such as a sugar. The silver mirror reaction is as follows:

2(Ag(NH_{3})_{2})^{+} + RCHO + 2OH^{−} → RCOOH + 2Ag + 4NH_{3}.

The size and shape of the nanoparticles produced are difficult to control and often have wide distributions. However, this method is often used to apply thin coatings of silver particles onto surfaces and further study into producing more uniformly sized nanoparticles is being done.

=== Ion implantation ===
Ion implantation has been used to create silver nanoparticles embedded in glass, polyurethane, silicone, polyethylene, and poly(methyl methacrylate). Particles are embedded in the substrate by means of bombardment at high accelerating voltages. At a fixed current density of the ion beam up to a certain value, the size of the embedded silver nanoparticles has been found to be monodisperse within the population, after which only an increase in the ion concentration is observed. A further increase in the ion beam dose has been found to reduce both the nanoparticle size and density in the target substrate, whereas an ion beam operating at a high accelerating voltage with a gradually increasing current density has been found to result in a gradual increase in the nanoparticle size. There are a few competing mechanisms which may result in the decrease in nanoparticle size; destruction of NPs upon collision, sputtering of the sample surface, particle fusion upon heating and dissociation.

The formation of embedded nanoparticles is complex, and all of the controlling parameters and factors have not yet been investigated. Computer simulation is still difficult as it involves processes of diffusion and clustering, however it can be broken down into a few different sub-processes such as implantation, diffusion, and growth. Upon implantation, silver ions will reach different depths within the substrate which approaches a Gaussian distribution with the mean centered at X depth. High temperature conditions during the initial stages of implantation will increase the impurity diffusion in the substrate and as a result limit the impinging ion saturation, which is required for nanoparticle nucleation. Both the implant temperature and ion beam current density are crucial to control in order to obtain a monodisperse nanoparticle size and depth distribution. A low current density may be used to counter the thermal agitation from the ion beam and a buildup of surface charge. After implantation on the surface, the beam currents may be raised as the surface conductivity will increase. The rate at which impurities diffuse drops quickly after the formation of the nanoparticles, which act as a mobile ion trap. This suggests that the beginning of the implantation process is critical for control of the spacing and depth of the resulting nanoparticles, as well as control of the substrate temperature and ion beam density. The presence and nature of these particles can be analyzed using numerous spectroscopy and microscopy instruments. Nanoparticles synthesized in the substrate exhibit surface plasmon resonances as evidenced by characteristic absorption bands; these features undergo spectral shifts depending on the nanoparticle size and surface asperities, however the optical properties also strongly depend on the substrate material of the composite.

=== Biological synthesis ===
The biological synthesis of nanoparticles has provided a means for improved techniques compared to the traditional methods that call for the use of harmful reducing agents like sodium borohydride. Many of these methods could improve their environmental footprint by replacing these relatively strong reducing agents. The commonly used biological methods are using plant or fruit extracts, fungi, and even animal parts like insect wing extract. The problems with the chemical production of silver nanoparticles is usually involves high cost and the longevity of the particles is short lived due to aggregation. The harshness of standard chemical methods has sparked the use of using biological organisms to reduce silver ions in solution into colloidal nanoparticles.

In addition, precise control over shape and size is vital during nanoparticle synthesis since the NPs therapeutic properties are intimately dependent on such factors. Hence, the primary focus of research in biogenic synthesis is in developing methods that consistently reproduce NPs with precise properties.

==== Fungi and bacteria ====
Bacterial and fungal synthesis of nanoparticles is practical because bacteria and fungi are easy to handle and can be modified genetically with ease. This provides a means to develop biomolecules that can synthesize AgNPs of varying shapes and sizes in high yield, which is at the forefront of current challenges in nanoparticle synthesis. Fungal strains such as Verticillium and bacterial strains such as Klebsiella pneumoniae can be used in the synthesis of silver nanoparticles. When the fungus/bacteria is added to solution, protein biomass is released into the solution. Electron donating residues such as tryptophan and tyrosine reduce silver ions in solution contributed by silver nitrate. These methods have been found to effectively create stable monodisperse nanoparticles without the use of harmful reducing agents.

A method has been found of reducing silver ions by the introduction of the fungus Fusarium oxysporum. The nanoparticles formed in this method have a size range between 5 and 15 nm and consist of silver hydrosol. The reduction of the silver nanoparticles is thought to come from an enzymatic process and silver nanoparticles produced are extremely stable due to interactions with proteins that are excreted by the fungi.

Bacterium found in silver mines, Pseudomonas stutzeri AG259, were able to construct silver particles in the shapes of triangles and hexagons. The size of these nanoparticles had a large range in size and some of them reached sizes larger than the usual nanoscale with a size of 200 nm. The silver nanoparticles were found in the organic matrix of the bacteria.

Lactic acid producing bacteria have been used to produce silver nanoparticles. The bacteria Lactobacillus spp., Pediococcus pentosaceus, Enteroccus faeciumI, and Lactococcus garvieae have been found to be able to reduce silver ions into silver nanoparticles. The production of the nanoparticles takes place in the cell from the interactions between the silver ions and the organic compounds of the cell. It was found that the bacterium Lactobacillus fermentum created the smallest silver nanoparticles with an average size of 11.2 nm. It was also found that this bacterium produced the nanoparticles with the smallest size distribution and the nanoparticles were found mostly on the outside of the cells. It was also found that there was an increase in the pH increased the rate of which the nanoparticles were produced and the amount of particles produced.

==== Plants ====
The reduction of silver ions into silver nanoparticles has also been achieved using geranium leaves. It has been found that adding geranium leaf extract to silver nitrate solutions causes their silver ions to be quickly reduced and that the nanoparticles produced are particularly stable. The silver nanoparticles produced in solution had a size range between 16 and 40 nm.

In another study different plant leaf extracts were used to reduce silver ions. It was found that out of Camellia sinensis (green tea), pine, persimmon, ginko, magnolia, and platanus that the magnolia leaf extract was the best at creating silver nanoparticles. This method created particles with a disperse size range of 15 to 500 nm, but it was also found that the particle size could be controlled by varying the reaction temperature. The speed at which the ions were reduced by the magnolia leaf extract was comparable to those of using chemicals to reduce.

The use of plants, microbes, and fungi in the production of silver nanoparticles is leading the way to more environmentally sound production of silver nanoparticles.

A green method is available for synthesizing silver nanoparticles using Amaranthus gangeticus Linn leaf extract.

=== Products and functionalization ===
At small sizes silver nanoparticles typically contain twins, either Icosahedral or decagedral. Synthetic protocols for silver nanoparticle production can be modified to produce silver nanoparticles with non-spherical geometries and also to functionalize nanoparticles with different materials, such as silica. Creating silver nanoparticles of different shapes and surface coatings allows for greater control over their size-specific properties.

==== Anisotropic structures ====
Silver nanoparticles can be synthesized in a variety of non-spherical (anisotropic) shapes. Because silver, like other noble metals, exhibits a size and shape dependent optical effect known as localized surface plasmon resonance (LSPR) at the nanoscale, the ability to synthesize Ag nanoparticles in different shapes vastly increases the ability to tune their optical behavior. For example, the wavelength at which LSPR occurs for a nanoparticle of one morphology (e.g. a sphere) will be different if that sphere is changed into a different shape. This shape dependence allows a silver nanoparticle to experience optical enhancement at a range of different wavelengths, even by keeping the size relatively constant, just by changing its shape. This aspect can be exploited in synthesis to promote change in shape of nanoparticles through light interaction. The applications of this shape-exploited expansion of optical behavior range from developing more sensitive biosensors to increasing the longevity of textiles.

===== Triangular nanoprisms =====
Triangular-shaped nanoparticles are a canonical type of anisotropic morphology studied for both gold and silver.

Though many different techniques for silver nanoprism synthesis exist, several methods employ a seed-mediated approach, which involves first synthesizing small (3-5 nm diameter) silver nanoparticles that offer a template for shape-directed growth into triangular nanostructures.

The silver seeds are synthesized by mixing silver nitrate and sodium citrate in aqueous solution and then rapidly adding sodium borohydride. Additional silver nitrate is added to the seed solution at low temperature, and the prisms are grown by slowly reducing the excess silver nitrate using ascorbic acid.

With the seed-mediated approach to silver nanoprism synthesis, selectivity of one shape over another can in part be controlled by the capping ligand. Using essentially the same procedure above but changing citrate to poly (vinyl pyrrolidone) (PVP) yields cube and rod-shaped nanostructures instead of triangular nanoprisms.

In addition to the seed mediated technique, silver nanoprisms can also be synthesized using a photo-mediated approach, in which preexisting spherical silver nanoparticles are transformed into triangular nanoprisms simply by exposing the reaction mixture to high intensities of light.

===== Nanocubes =====
Silver nanocubes can be synthesized using ethylene glycol as a reducing agent and PVP as a capping agent, in a polyol synthesis reaction (vide supra). A typical synthesis using these reagents involves adding fresh silver nitrate and PVP to a solution of ethylene glycol heated at 140 °C.

This procedure can actually be modified to produce another anisotropic silver nanostructure, nanowires, by just allowing the silver nitrate solution to age before using it in the synthesis. By allowing the silver nitrate solution to age, the initial nanostructure formed during the synthesis is slightly different than that obtained with fresh silver nitrate, which influences the growth process, and therefore, the morphology of the final product.

Nanorods, Nanobars, and Nanowires

Silver nanorods (also categorized as nanobars or nanowires depending on their aspect ratio), are a class of anisotropic nanoparticles extensively studied for their tunable electrical and optical properties. Their morphology is typically controlled by selective capping agents during the synthesis. For instance, polyvinylpyrrodine (PVP) can strongly bind to the {100} facets of silver seeds while interacting more weakly with the {111} facets. This preferential adsorption restricts growth on the {100} surfaces and promotes elongation at the <110> direction, ultimately resulting in the formation of rod-like structures.

==== Coating with silica ====
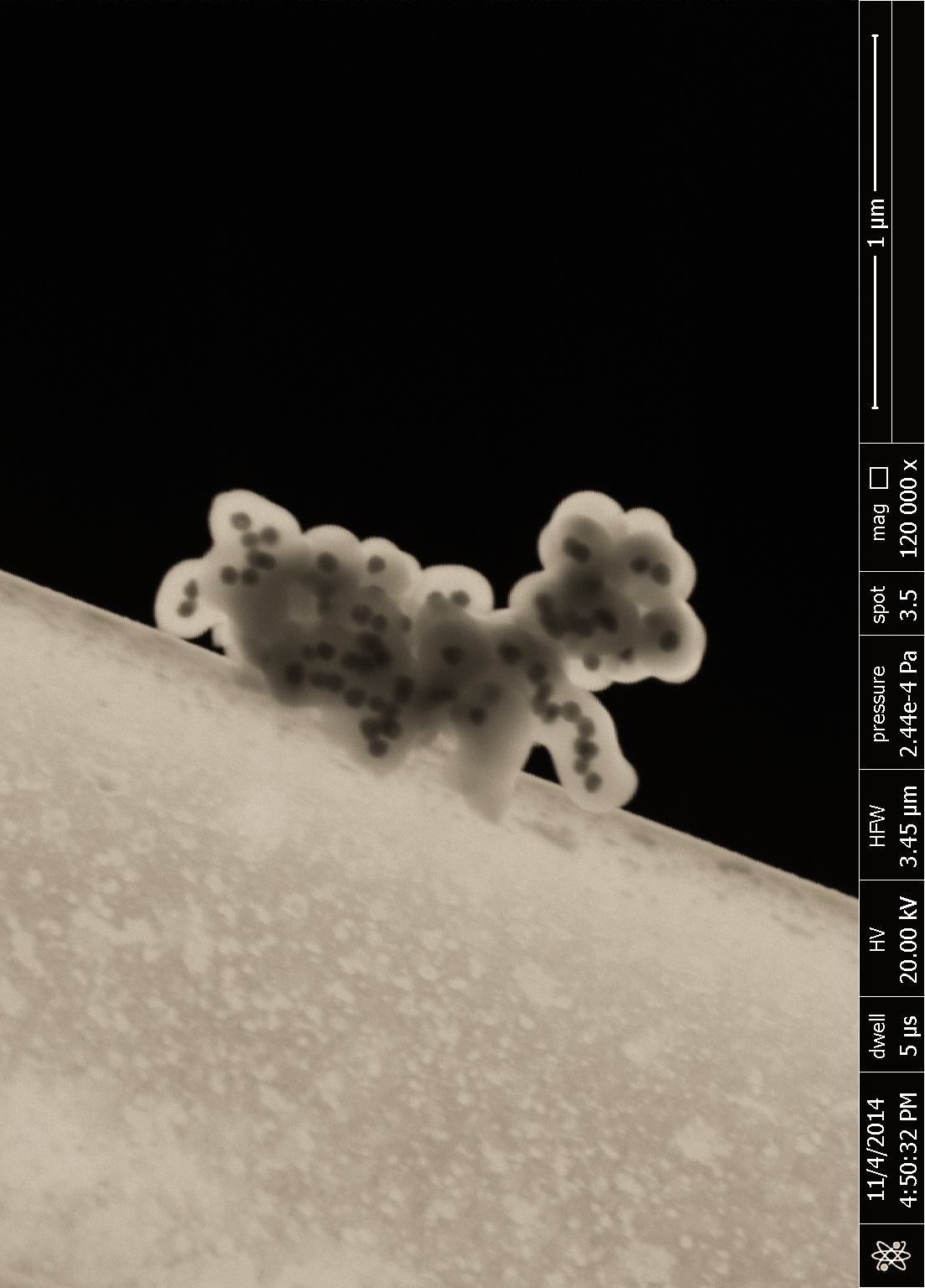
Electron micrograph of core-shell nanoparticles, which comprise dark silver cores and light silica shells

In this method, polyvinylpyrrolidone (PVP) is dissolved in water by sonication and mixed with silver colloid particles. Active stirring ensures the PVP has adsorbed to the nanoparticle surface. Centrifuging separates the PVP coated nanoparticles which are then transferred to a solution of ethanol to be centrifuged further and placed in a solution of ammonia, ethanol and Si(OEt_{4}) (TES). Stirring for twelve hours results in the silica shell being formed consisting of a surrounding layer of silicon oxide with an ether linkage available to add functionality. Varying the amount of TES allows for different thicknesses of shells formed. This technique is popular due to the ability to add a variety of functionality to the exposed silica surface.

== Metrology ==
A number of reference materials are available for silver nanoparticles. NIST RM 8017 contains 75 nm silver nanoparticles embedded in a cake of the polymer polyvinylpyrrolidone to stabilize them against oxidation for a long shelf life. They have reference values for mean particle size using dynamic light scattering, ultra-small-angle X-ray scattering, atomic force microscopy, and transmission electron microscopy; and size distribution reference values for the latter two methods. The BAM-N001 certified reference material contains silver nanoparticles with a specified size distribution with a number-weighted median size of 12.6 nm measured by small-angle X-ray scattering and transmission electron microscopy.

== Use ==
=== Catalysis ===
Larger silver particles are a well established commercial catalyst used for the epoxidation of ethylene. Silver nanoparticles for catalysis has been gaining some attention in recent years. Although the most common applications are for medicinal or antibacterial purposes, silver nanoparticles have been demonstrated to show catalytic redox properties for dyes, benzene, and carbon monoxide.

==== Supported on silica spheres – reduction of dyes ====
Silver nanoparticles have been synthesized on a support of inert silica spheres. The support plays virtually no role in the catalytic ability and serves as a method of preventing coalescence of the silver nanoparticles in colloidal solution. Thus, the silver nanoparticles were stabilized and it was possible to demonstrate the ability of them to serve as an electron relay for the reduction of dyes by sodium borohydride. Without the silver nanoparticle catalyst, virtually no reaction occurs between sodium borohydride and the various dyes: methylene blue, eosin, and rose bengal.

==== Mesoporous aerogel – selective oxidation of benzene ====
Silver nanoparticles supported on aerogel are advantageous due to the higher number of active sites. The highest selectivity for oxidation of benzene to phenol was observed at low weight percent of silver in the aerogel matrix (1% Ag). This better selectivity is believed to be a result of the higher monodispersity within the aerogel matrix of the 1% Ag sample. Each weight percent solution formed different sized particles with a different width of size range.

==== Silver alloy – synergistic oxidation of carbon monoxide ====
Au-Ag alloy nanoparticles have been shown to have a synergistic effect on the oxidation of carbon monoxide (CO). On its own, each pure-metal nanoparticle shows very poor catalytic activity for CO oxidation; together, the catalytic properties are greatly enhanced. It is proposed that the gold acts as a strong binding agent for the oxygen atom and the silver serves as a strong oxidizing catalyst, although the exact mechanism is still not completely understood. When synthesized in an Au/Ag ratio from 3:1 to 10:1, the alloyed nanoparticles showed complete conversion when 1% CO was fed in air at ambient temperature. The size of the alloyed particles did not play a big role in the catalytic ability. It is well known that gold nanoparticles only show catalytic properties for CO when they are ~3 nm in size, but alloyed particles up to 30 nm demonstrated excellent catalytic activity – catalytic activity better than that of gold nanoparticles on active support such as TiO_{2}, Fe_{2}O_{3}, etc.

==== Light-enhanced ====
Plasmonic effects have been studied quite extensively. Until recently, there have not been studies investigating the oxidative catalytic enhancement of a nanostructure via excitation of its surface plasmon resonance. The defining feature for enhancing the oxidative catalytic ability has been identified as the ability to convert a beam of light into the form of energetic electrons that can be transferred to adsorbed molecules. The implication of such a feature is that photochemical reactions can be driven by low-intensity continuous light coupled with thermal energy.

The coupling of low-intensity continuous light and thermal energy has been performed with silver nanocubes. The important feature of silver nanostructures that are enabling for photocatalysis is their nature to create resonant surface plasmons from light in the visible range.

The addition of light enhancement enabled the particles to perform to the same degree as particles that were heated up to 40 K greater. This is a profound finding when noting that a reduction in temperature of 25 K can increase the catalyst lifetime by nearly tenfold, when comparing the photothermal and thermal process.

=== Biological research ===
Researchers have explored the use of silver nanoparticles as carriers for delivering various payloads such as small drug molecules or large biomolecules to specific targets. Once the AgNP has had sufficient time to reach its target, release of the payload could potentially be triggered by an internal or external stimulus. The targeting and accumulation of nanoparticles may provide high payload concentrations at specific target sites and could minimize side effects.

==== Chemotherapy ====
The introduction of nanotechnology into medicine is expected to advance diagnostic cancer imaging and the standards for therapeutic drug design. Nanotechnology may uncover insight about the structure, function and organizational level of the biosystem at the nanoscale.

Silver nanoparticles can undergo coating techniques that offer a uniform functionalized surface to which substrates can be added. When the nanoparticle is coated, for example, in silica the surface exists as silicic acid. Substrates can thus be added through stable ether and ester linkages that are not degraded immediately by natural metabolic enzymes. Recent chemotherapeutic applications have designed anti cancer drugs with a photo cleavable linker, such as an ortho-nitrobenzyl bridge, attaching it to the substrate on the nanoparticle surface. The low toxicity nanoparticle complex can remain viable under metabolic attack for the time necessary to be distributed throughout the bodies systems. If a cancerous tumor is being targeted for treatment, ultraviolet light can be introduced over the tumor region. The electromagnetic energy of the light causes the photo responsive linker to break between the drug and the nanoparticle substrate. The drug is now cleaved and released in an unaltered active form to act on the cancerous tumor cells. Advantages anticipated for this method is that the drug is transported without highly toxic compounds, the drug is released without harmful radiation or relying on a specific chemical reaction to occur and the drug can be selectively released at a target tissue.

A second approach is to attach a chemotherapeutic drug directly to the functionalized surface of the silver nanoparticle combined with a nucelophilic species to undergo a displacement reaction. For example, once the nanoparticle drug complex enters or is in the vicinity of the target tissue or cells, a glutathione monoester can be administered to the site. The nucleophilic ester oxygen will attach to the functionalized surface of the nanoparticle through a new ester linkage while the drug is released to its surroundings. The drug is now active and can exert its biological function on the cells immediate to its surroundings limiting non-desirable interactions with other tissues.

==== Multiple drug resistance ====
A major cause for the ineffectiveness of current chemotherapy treatments is multiple drug resistance which can arise from several mechanisms.

Nanoparticles can provide a means to overcome MDR. In general, when using a targeting agent to deliver nanocarriers to cancer cells, it is imperative that the agent binds with high selectivity to molecules that are uniquely expressed on the cell surface. Hence NPs can be designed with proteins that specifically detect drug resistant cells with overexpressed transporter proteins on their surface. A pitfall of the commonly used nano-drug delivery systems is that free drugs that are released from the nanocarriers into the cytosol get exposed to the MDR transporters once again, and are exported. To solve this, 8 nm nanocrystalline silver particles were modified by the addition of trans-activating transcriptional activator (TAT), derived from the HIV-1 virus, which acts as a cell-penetrating peptide (CPP). Generally, AgNP effectiveness is limited due to the lack of efficient cellular uptake; however, CPP-modification has become one of the most efficient methods for improving intracellular delivery of nanoparticles. Once ingested, the export of the AgNP is prevented based on a size exclusion. The concept is simple: the nanoparticles are too large to be effluxed by the MDR transporters, because the efflux function is strictly subjected to the size of its substrates, which is generally limited to a range of 300-2000 Da. Thereby the nanoparticulates remain insusceptible to the efflux, providing a means to accumulate in high concentrations.

Other mechanisms by which silver nanoparticles circumvent MDR include interference with viral replication, prevention of viral fusion with the host cell membrane, direct attachment to virions, and lysing of virions.

==== Antimicrobial ====
Introduction of silver into bacterial cells induces a high degree of structural and morphological changes, which can lead to cell death. As the silver nanoparticles come in contact with the bacteria, they adhere to the cell wall and cell membrane. Once bound, some of the silver passes through to the inside, and interacts with phosphate-containing compounds like DNA and RNA, while another portion adheres to the sulfur-containing proteins on the membrane. The silver-sulfur interactions at the membrane cause the cell wall to undergo structural changes, like the formation of pits and pores. Through these pores, cellular components are released into the extracellular fluid, simply due to the osmotic difference. Within the cell, the integration of silver creates a low molecular weight region where the DNA then condenses. Having DNA in a condensed state inhibits the cell's replication proteins contact with the DNA. Thus the introduction of silver nanoparticles inhibits replication and is sufficient to cause the death of the cell. Further increasing their effect, when silver comes in contact with fluids, it tends to ionize which increases the nanoparticles' bactericidal activity. This has been correlated to the suppression of enzymes and inhibited expression of proteins that relate to the cell's ability to produce ATP.

Although it varies for every type of cell proposed, as their cell membrane composition varies greatly, It has been seen that in general, silver nanoparticles with an average size of 10 nm or less show electronic effects that greatly increase their bactericidal activity. This could also be partly due to the fact that as particle size decreases, reactivity increases due to the surface area to volume ratio increasing.

Silver nanoparticles have been shown to have synergistic antibacterial activity with commonly used antibiotics such as; penicillin G, ampicillin, erythromycin, clindamycin, and vancomycin against E. coli and S. aureus. Furthermore, synergistic antibacterial activity has been reported between silver nanoparticles and hydrogen peroxide causing this combination to exert significantly enhanced bactericidal effect against both Gram negative and Gram positive bacteria. This antibacterial synergy between silver nanoparticles and hydrogen peroxide can be possibly attributed to a Fenton-like reaction that generates highly reactive oxygen species such as hydroxyl radicals.

Silver nanoparticles can prevent bacteria from growing on or adhering to the surface. This can be especially useful in surgical settings where all surfaces in contact with the patient must be sterile. Silver nanoparticles can be incorporated on many types of surfaces including metals, plastic, and glass. In medical equipment, it has been shown that silver nano particles lower the bacterial count on devices used compared to old techniques. However, the problem arises when the procedure is over and a new one must be done. In the process of washing the instruments a large portion of the silver nano particles become less effective due to the loss of silver ions. They are more commonly used in skin grafts for burn victims as the silver nano particles embedded with the graft provide better antimicrobial activity and result in significantly less scarring of the victim.These new applications are direct decedents of older practices that used silver nitrate to treat conditions such as skin ulcers. Now, silver nanoparticles are used in bandages and patches to help heal certain burns and wounds. An alternative approach is to use AgNP to sterilise biological dressings (for example, tilapia fish skin) for burn and wound management.

They also show promising application as water treatment method to form clean potable water. This doesn't sound like much, but water contains numerous diseases and some parts of the world do not have the luxury of clean water, or any at all. It wasn't new to use silver for removing microbes, but this experiment used the carbonate in water to make microbes even more vulnerable to silver. First the scientists of the experiment use the nanopaticles to remove certain pesticides from the water, ones that prove fatal to people if ingested. Several other tests have shown that the silver nanoparticles were capable of removing certain ions in water as well, like iron, lead, and arsenic. But that is not the only reason why the silver nanoparticles are so appealing, they do not require any external force (no electricity of hydrolics) for the reaction to occur. Conversely, post-consumer silver nanoparticles in waste water may adversely impact biological agents used in waste water treatment.

=== Alternative medicine ===
Since about 1990, there has been a resurgence of the promotion of colloidal silver as a dietary supplement or used otherwise internally, marketed with claims of its being an essential mineral supplement, or that it can prevent or treat numerous diseases, such as cancer, diabetes, arthritis, HIV/AIDS, herpes, and tuberculosis. No medical evidence supports the effectiveness of colloidal silver for any of these claimed indications. Silver is not an essential mineral in humans; there is no dietary requirement for silver, and hence, no such thing as a silver "deficiency". There is no evidence that colloidal silver treats or prevents any medical condition, and it can cause serious and potentially irreversible side effects, such as argyria.

=== Consumer Goods ===
==== Washing machines ====
There are instances in which silver nanoparticles and colloidal silver are used in consumer goods. Samsung for example claimed that the use of silver nanoparticles in washing machines would help to sterilize clothes and water during the washing and rinsing functions, and allow clothes to be cleaned without the need for hot water. The nanoparticles in these appliances are synthesized using electrolysis. Through electrolysis, silver is extracted from metal plates and then turned into silver nanoparticles by a reduction agent. This method avoids the drying, cleaning, and re-dispersion processes, which are generally required with alternative colloidal synthesis methods. Importantly, the electrolysis strategy also decreases the production cost of Ag nanoparticles, making these washing machines more affordable to manufacture. Samsung has described the system:

[A] grapefruit-sized device alongside the [washer] tub uses electrical currents to nanoshave two silver plates the size of large chewing gum sticks. Resulting in positively charged silver atoms-silver ions (Ag^{+})-are injected into the tub during the wash cycle.

Samsung's description of the Ag nanoparticle generating process seems to contradict its advertisement of silver nanoparticles. Instead, the statement indicates that laundry cycles. When clothes are run through the cycle, the intended mode of action is that bacteria contained in the water are sterilized as they interact with the silver present in the washing tub. As a result, these washing machines can provide antibacterial and sterilization benefits on top of conventional washing methods. Samsung has commented on the lifetime of these silver-containing washing machines. The electrolysis of silver generates over 400 billion silver ions during each wash cycle. Given the size of the silver source (two "gum-sized" plate of Ag), Samsung estimates that these plates can last up to 3000 wash cycles.

These plans by Samsung were not overlooked by regulatory agencies. Agencies investigating nanoparticle use include but are not limited to: the U.S. FDA, U.S. EPA, SIAA of Japan, and Korea's Testing and Research Institute for Chemical Industry and FITI Testing & Research Institute. These various agencies plan to regulate silver nanoparticles in appliances. These washing machines are some of the first cases in which the EPA has sought to regulate nanoparticles in consumer goods. Samsung stated that the silver gets washed away in the sewer and regulatory agencies worry over what that means for wastewater treatment streams. Currently, the EPA classifies silver nanoparticles as pesticides due to their use as antimicrobial agents in wastewater purification. The washing machines being developed by Samsung do contain a pesticide and have to be registered and tested for safety under the law, particularly the U.S. Federal Insecticide, Fungicide, and Rodenticide Act. The difficulty, however behind regulating nanotechnology in this manner is that there is no distinct way to measure toxicity.

==== Bedding ====
Silver is widely studied for its antimicrobial properties, particularly its ability to inhibit microbial growth and reduce odor formation in textiles. It is also used in some textile applications for its thermal conductivity. Bed sheets, bed pillows, comforters, and other bedding products infused with ions are marketed for their antimicrobial and antifungal additives.

==== Colourants and pigments ====
In addition to the uses described above, the European Union Observatory for Nanomaterials (EUON) has highlighted that silver nanoparticles are used in colourants in cosmetics, as well as pigments. A recently published study by the EUON has illustrated the existence of knowledge gaps regarding the safety of nanoparticles in pigments.

== Health and safety ==
The U.S. National Institute for Occupational Safety and Health derived a recommended exposure limit (REL) for silver nanomaterials (with <100 nm primary particle size) of 0.9 μg/m^{3} as an airborne respirable 8-hour time-weighted average (TWA) concentration. This is in comparison to its REL of 10 μg/m^{3} as an 8-hour TWA for total silver (including metal dust, fumes, and soluble compounds). It was found that the unbound silver cation is the ultimate toxicant, and ions formed extracellularly drive toxicity after exposure to Ag nanoparticles.

Although silver nanoparticles are widely used in a variety of commercial products, there has only recently been a major effort to study their effects on human health. There have been several studies that describe the in vitro toxicity of silver nanoparticles to a variety of different organs, including the lung, liver, skin, brain, and reproductive organs. The mechanism of the toxicity of silver nanoparticles to human cells appears to be derived from oxidative stress and inflammation that is caused by the generation of reactive oxygen species (ROS) stimulated by either the Ag NPs, Ag ions, or both. For example, Park et al. showed that exposure of a mouse peritoneal macrophage cell line (RAW267.7) to silver nanoparticles decreased the cell viability in a concentration- and time-dependent manner. They further showed that the intracellular reduced glutathionine (GSH), which is a ROS scavenger, decreased to 81.4% of the control group of silver nanoparticles at 1.6 ppm.

=== Modes of toxicity ===
Since silver nanoparticles undergo dissolution releasing silver ions, which is well-documented to have toxic effects, there have been several studies that have been conducted to determine whether the toxicity of silver nanoparticles is derived from the release of silver ions or from the nanoparticle itself. Several studies suggest that the toxicity of silver nanoparticles is attributed to their release of silver ions in cells as both silver nanoparticles and silver ions have been reported to have similar cytotoxicity. For example, In some cases it is reported that silver nanoparticles facilitate the release of toxic free silver ions in cells via a "Trojan-horse type mechanism", where the particle enters cells and is then ionized within the cell. However, there have been reports that suggest that a combination of silver nanoparticles and ions is responsible for the toxic effect of silver nanoparticles. Navarro et al. using cysteine ligands as a tool to measure the concentration of free silver in solution, determined that although initially silver ions were 18 times more likely to inhibit the photosynthesis of an algae, Chlamydomanas reinhardtii, but after 2 hours of incubation it was revealed that the algae containing silver nanoparticles were more toxic than just silver ions alone. Furthermore, there are studies that suggest that silver nanoparticles induce toxicity independent of free silver ions. For example, Asharani et al. compared phenotypic defects observed in zebrafish treated with silver nanoparticles and silver ions and determined that the phenotypic defects observed with silver nanoparticle treatment was not observed with silver ion-treated embryos, suggesting that the toxicity of silver nanoparticles is independent of silver ions.

Protein channels and nuclear membrane pores can often be in the size range of 9 nm to 10 nm in diameter. Small silver nanoparticles constructed of this size have the ability to not only pass through the membrane to interact with internal structures but also to become lodged within the membrane. Silver nanoparticle depositions in the membrane can impact regulation of solutes, exchange of proteins and cell recognition. Exposure to silver nanoparticles has been associated with "inflammatory, oxidative, genotoxic, and cytotoxic consequences"; the silver particulates primarily accumulate in the liver. but have also been shown to be toxic in other organs including the brain. Nano-silver applied to tissue-cultured human cells leads to the formation of free radicals, raising concerns of potential health risks.

- Allergic reaction: There have been several studies conducted that show a precedence for allergenicity of silver nanoparticles.
- Argyria and staining: Ingested silver or silver compounds, including colloidal silver, can cause a condition called argyria, a discoloration of the skin and organs.In 2006, there was a case study of a 17-year-old man, who sustained burns to 30% of his body, and experienced a temporary bluish-grey hue after several days of treatment with Acticoat, a brand of wound dressing containing silver nanoparticles. Argyria is the deposition of silver in deep tissues, a condition that cannot happen on a temporary basis, raising the question of whether the cause of the man's discoloration was argyria or even a result of the silver treatment. Silver dressings are known to cause a "transient discoloration" that dissipates in 2–14 days, but not a permanent discoloration.
- Silzone heart valve: St. Jude Medical released a mechanical heart valve with a silver coated sewing cuff (coated using ion beam-assisted deposition) in 1997. The valve was designed to reduce the instances of endocarditis. The valve was approved for sale in Canada, Europe, the United States, and most other markets around the world. In a post-commercialization study, researchers showed that the valve prevented tissue ingrowth, created paravalvular leakage, valve loosening, and in the worst cases explantation. After 3 years on the market and 36,000 implants, St. Jude discontinued and voluntarily recalled the valve.

== See also ==
- Oxidative dissolution of silver nanoparticles
- Environmental impact of silver nanoparticles

== Bibliography ==
- Cao H (2017). Silver Nanoparticles for Antibacterial Devices: Biocompatibility and Toxicity. CRC Press. ISBN 978-1-315-35347-0.
