= Viedma ripening =

Attrition-enhanced deracemization

Viedma ripening or attrition-enhanced deracemization is a chiral symmetry breaking phenomenon observed in solid/liquid mixtures of enantiomorphous (racemic conglomerate) crystals that are subjected to comminution. It can be classified in the wider area of spontaneous symmetry breaking phenomena observed in chemistry and physics.

It was discovered in 2005 by geologist Cristobal Viedma, who used glass beads and a magnetic stirrer to enable particle breakage of a racemic mixture of enantiomorphous sodium chlorate crystals in contact with their saturated solution in water. A sigmoidal (autocatalytic) increase in the solid-phase enantiomeric excess of the mixture was obtained, eventually leading to homochirality, i.e. the complete disappearance of one of the chiral species. Since the original discovery, Viedma ripening has been observed in a variety of intrinsically chiral organic compounds that exhibit conglomerate crystallization and are able to inter-convert in the liquid via racemization reactions. It is also regarded as a potential new technique to separate enantiomers of chiral molecules in the pharmaceutical and fine chemical industries (chiral resolution).

== Mechanism ==
The exact interplay of the mechanisms leading to deracemization in Viedma ripening is a subject of ongoing scientific debate. It is, however, currently believed that for intrinsically chiral molecules, deracemization occurs via a combination of various phenomena:

- Crystal growth and dissolution due to the particle-size dependence of solubility (i.e. Ostwald ripening)
- Enantiospecific cluster aggregation to larger particles of the same chirality
- Particle breakage
- Racemization

Two key assumptions often invoked to explain the mechanism is that: a) small fragments generated by breakage for each enantiomeric crystal population can maintain their chirality, even when they are smaller than the critical radius for nucleation (and are thus expected to dissolve) and b) small chiral fragments can undergo enantiospecific aggregation to larger particles of the same chirality. Using these two assumptions, it can be shown mathematically, that any stochastic even immeasurable asymmetry of one enantiomeric crystal population over the other can be amplified to homochirality in a random manner.

== Implications for the origin of life ==
In principle, molecules required for the generation of life, i.e. amino acids that combine to form proteins and sugars that form DNA molecules are all chiral and are thus able to adopt two mirror-image forms (often described as left- and right-handed), which from a chemical perspective are equally likely to exist. However, all biologically-relevant molecules known on earth are of a single handedness, even though their mirror images are also capable of forming similar molecules. The reason of the prevalence of homochirality in living organisms is currently unknown and is often connected to the origin of life itself. Whether homochirality emerged before or after life is currently unknown, but many researchers believe that homochirality could have been a result of amplification of extremely small chiral asymmetries.

Since Viedma ripening has been observed in biologically-relevant molecules, such as chiral amino acids it has been put forward by some as a possible contributing mechanism for chiral amplification in a prebiotic world.

== See also ==
- Crystallization
- Racemic mixture
- Chiral symmetry breaking
- Racemization
- Ostwald ripening
- Solubility equilibrium
- Chiral resolution
- Enantioselective synthesis
- Stereoselectivity
- Spontaneous absolute asymmetric synthesis
