= Ostwald's rule =

Rule stating that the less stable polymorphs crystallize first

In materials science, Ostwald's rule or Ostwald's step rule, conceived by Wilhelm Ostwald, describes the formation of polymorphs. The rule states that usually the less stable polymorph crystallizes first. It also often corresponds to the most soluble phase. Ostwald's rule is not a universal law but a common tendency observed in nature.

This can be explained based on irreversible thermodynamics, structural relationships, or a combined consideration of statistical thermodynamics and structural variation with temperature. Unstable polymorphs more closely resemble the state in solution, and thus are kinetically advantaged.

For example, out of hot water, metastable, fibrous crystals of benzamide appear first, only later to spontaneously convert to the more stable rhombic polymorph. A dramatic example is phosphorus, which upon sublimation first forms the less stable white phosphorus, which only slowly polymerizes to the red allotrope. This is notably the case for the anatase polymorph of titanium dioxide, which having a lower surface energy is commonly the first phase to form by crystallisation from amorphous precursors or solutions despite being metastable, with rutile being the equilibrium phase at all temperatures and pressures.

In the case of calcium carbonate (CaCO_{3}) precipitation from an aqueous solution, a kind of unstable colloidal sol, or gel, forms first as an aqueous suspension, then it evolves at room temperature into vaterite (hexagonal), the less stable and most soluble polymorph of CaCO_{3}, and, depending on the temperature of the solution, into calcite (hexagonal, ρ = 2.7 g/cm^{3}) (T ~ 40 °C) or aragonite (orthorhombic, ρ = 2.9 g/cm^{3}) (T > 70 °C).

== See also ==
- Chemical crystallography before X-rays
- Nucleation
- Crystal growth
- Disappearing polymorph
- Ostwald ripening
- Digestion and ageing of precipitates
