= Crystal polymorphism =

Ability of a solid material to exist in more than one form or crystal structure

In crystallography, polymorphism is a phenomenon where a compound or element can crystallize into more than one crystal structure. The definition of polymorphism has evolved over the years and as of 2023 is still under discussion. The discussion involves distinguishing among types of transitions and structural changes occurring in polymorphism versus those occurring in other phenomena.

== Overview ==
Phase transitions (phase changes) that help describe polymorphism include polymorphic transitions as well as melting and vaporization transitions. According to IUPAC, a polymorphic transition is "A reversible transition of a solid crystalline phase at a certain temperature and pressure (the inversion point) to another phase of the same chemical composition with a different crystal structure." Additionally, Walter McCrone described the phases in polymorphic matter as "different in crystal structure but identical in the liquid or vapor states." McCrone also defines a polymorph as "a crystalline phase of a given compound resulting from the possibility of at least two different arrangements of the molecules of that compound in the solid state." These defining facts imply that polymorphism involves changes in physical properties but cannot include chemical change. Some early definitions do not make this distinction.

Eliminating chemical change from those changes permissible during a polymorphic transition delineates polymorphism. For example, isomerization can often lead to polymorphic transitions. However, tautomerism (dynamic isomerization) leads to chemical change, not polymorphism. As well, allotropy of elements and polymorphism have been linked historically. However, allotropes of an element are not always polymorphs. A common example is the allotropes of carbon, which include graphite, diamond, and lonsdaleite. While all three forms are allotropes, graphite is not a polymorph of diamond and lonsdaleite. Isomerization and allotropy are only two of the phenomena linked to polymorphism. For additional information about identifying polymorphism and distinguishing it from other phenomena, see the review by Brog et al.

Materials with two polymorphic phases can be called dimorphic, those with three polymorphic phases, trimorphic, etc. Polymorphism is of practical relevance to pharmaceuticals, agrochemicals, pigments, dyestuffs, foods, and explosives.

== Detection ==
=== Experimental methods ===
Early records of the discovery of polymorphism credit Eilhard Mitscherlich and Jöns Jacob Berzelius for their studies of phosphates and arsenates in the early 1800s. The studies involved measuring the interfacial angles of the crystals to show that chemically identical salts could have two different forms. Mitscherlich originally called this discovery isomorphism. The measurement of crystal density was also used by Wilhelm Ostwald and expressed in Ostwald's Ratio.

The development of the microscope enhanced observations of polymorphism and aided Moritz Ludwig Frankenheim's studies in the 1830s. He was able to demonstrate methods to induce crystal phase changes and formally summarized his findings on the nature of polymorphism. Soon after, the more sophisticated polarized light microscope came into use, and it provided better visualization of crystalline phases allowing crystallographers to distinguish between different polymorphs. The hot stage was invented and fitted to a polarized light microscope by Otto Lehmann in about 1877. This invention helped crystallographers determine melting points and observe polymorphic transitions.

While the use of hot stage microscopes continued throughout the 1900s, thermal methods also became commonly used to observe the heat flow that occurs during phase changes such as melting and polymorphic transitions. One such technique, differential scanning calorimetry (DSC), continues to be used for determining the enthalpy of polymorphic transitions.

In the 20th century, X-ray crystallography became commonly used for studying the crystal structure of polymorphs. Both single crystal x-ray diffraction and powder x-ray diffraction techniques are used to obtain measurements of the crystal unit cell. Each polymorph of a compound has a unique crystal structure. As a result, different polymorphs will produce different x-ray diffraction patterns.

Vibrational spectroscopic methods came into use for investigating polymorphism in the second half of the twentieth century and have become more commonly used as optical, computer, and semiconductor technologies improved. These techniques include infrared (IR) spectroscopy, terahertz spectroscopy and Raman spectroscopy. Mid-frequency IR and Raman spectroscopies are sensitive to changes in hydrogen bonding patterns. Such changes can subsequently be related to structural differences. Additionally, terahertz and low frequency Raman spectroscopies reveal vibrational modes resulting from intermolecular interactions in crystalline solids. Again, these vibrational modes are related to crystal structure and can be used to uncover differences in 3-dimensional structure among polymorphs.

=== Computational methods ===
Computational chemistry may be used in combination with vibrational spectroscopy techniques to understand the origins of vibrations within crystals. The combination of techniques provides detailed information about crystal structures, similar to what can be achieved with x-ray crystallography. In addition to using computational methods for enhancing the understanding of spectroscopic data, the latest development in identifying polymorphism in crystals is the field of crystal structure prediction. This technique uses computational chemistry to model the formation of crystals and predict the existence of specific polymorphs of a compound before they have been observed experimentally by scientists.

Beyond the experimental possibilities, computational methods have been employed to study atomistic changes in crystal structures at varying temperatures and under different atmospheres. In the case of porous materials, the presence of guest molecules can induce guest-specific structural phases.

== Examples ==
Many compounds exhibit polymorphism. It has been claimed that "every compound has different polymorphic forms, and that, in general, the number of forms known for a given compound is proportional to the time and money spent in research on that compound."

=== Organic compounds ===
==== Benzamide ====
The phenomenon was discovered in 1832 by Friedrich Wöhler and Justus von Liebig. They observed that the silky needles of freshly crystallized benzamide slowly converted to rhombic crystals. Present-day analysis identifies three polymorphs for benzamide: the least stable one, formed by flash cooling, is the orthorhombic form II. This type is followed by the monoclinic form III (observed by Wöhler/Liebig). The most stable form is monoclinic form I. The hydrogen bonding mechanisms are the same for all three phases; however, they differ strongly in their pi-pi interactions.

==== Maleic acid ====
In 2006 a new polymorph of maleic acid was discovered, 124 years after the first crystal form was studied. Maleic acid is manufactured on an industrial scale in the chemical industry. It forms salt found in medicine. The new crystal type is produced when a co-crystal of caffeine and maleic acid (2:1) is dissolved in chloroform and when the solvent is allowed to evaporate slowly. Whereas form I has monoclinic space group P2_{1}/c, the new form has space group Pc. Both polymorphs consist of sheets of molecules connected through hydrogen bonding of the carboxylic acid groups: in form I, the sheets alternate with respect of the net dipole moment, while in form II, the sheets are oriented in the same direction.

==== 1,3,5-Trinitrobenzene ====
After 125 years of study, 1,3,5-trinitrobenzene yielded a second polymorph. The usual form has the space group Pbca, but in 2004, a second polymorph was obtained in the space group Pca2_{1} when the compound was crystallised in the presence of an additive, trisindane. This experiment shows that additives can induce the appearance of polymorphic forms.

==== Other organic compounds ====
Acridine has been obtained as eight polymorphs and aripiprazole has nine. The record for the largest number of well-characterised polymorphs is held by a compound known as ROY. Glycine crystallizes as both monoclinic and hexagonal crystals. Polymorphism in organic compounds is often the result of conformational polymorphism.

=== Organic mixtures ===
Cocoa butter has six crystal polymorphs with different melting-points, mechanical properties, and separation behavior (chocolate bloom). They are named in an order of increasing melting point. The most desired form V, with a combination of snap and gloss, is produced by tempering, see tempered chocolate. The forms differ by family (I, II: hexagonal; III, IV: orthorhombic perpendicular; V, VI: triclinic) and by how fatty acid tails are packed.

=== Inorganic matter ===
==== Elements ====
Elements including metals may exhibit polymorphism. Allotropy is the term used when describing elements having different forms and is used commonly in the field of metallurgy. Some (but not all) allotropes are also polymorphs. For example, iron has three allotropes that are also polymorphs. Alpha-iron, which exists at room temperature, has a bcc form. Above 910 degrees gamma-iron exists, which has a fcc form. Above 1390 degrees delta-iron exists with a bcc form.

Another metallic example is tin, which has two allotropes that are also polymorphs. At room temperature, beta-tin exists as a white tetragonal form. When cooled below 13.2 degrees, alpha-tin forms which is gray in color and has a cubic diamond form. Alpha-tin has a lower density, tearing apart the tin part from within. This is known as tin pest.

A classic example of a nonmetal that exhibits polymorphism is carbon. Carbon has many allotropes, including graphite, diamond, and lonsdaleite. However, these are not all polymorphs of each other. Graphite is not a polymorph of diamond and londsdaleite, since it is chemically distinct, having sp^{2} hybridized bonding. Diamond and londsdaleite are chemically identical, both having sp^{3} hybridized bonding, and they differ only in their crystal structures, making them polymorphs. Additionally, graphite has two polymorphs, a hexagonal (alpha) form and a rhombohedral (beta) form.

==== Binary metal oxides ====
Polymorphism in binary metal oxides has attracted much attention because these materials are of significant economic value. One set of famous examples have the composition SiO_{2}, which form many polymorphs. Important ones include: α-quartz, β-quartz, tridymite, cristobalite, moganite, coesite, and stishovite.

Metal oxides	Phase	Conditions of P and T	Structure/Space Group
CrO_{2}	α phase	Ambient conditions	Cl_{2}-type Orthorhombic
CrO_{2}	RT and 12±3 GPa		
Cr_{2}O_{3}	Corundum phase	Ambient conditions	Corundum-type Rhombohedral (R3̅c)
Cr_{2}O_{3}	High pressure phase	RT and 35 GPa	Rh_{2}O_{3}-II type
Fe_{2}O_{3}	α phase	Ambient conditions	Corundum-type Rhombohedral (R3̅c)
Fe_{2}O_{3}	β phase	Below 773 K	Body-centered cubic (Ia3̅)
Fe_{2}O_{3}	γ phase	Up to 933 K	Cubic spinel structure (Fd3̅m)
Fe_{2}O_{3}	ε phase	--	Rhombic (Pna21)
Bi_{2}O_{3}	α phase	Ambient conditions	Monoclinic (P21/c)
Bi_{2}O_{3}	β phase	603-923 K and 100 kPa (1 atm)	Tetragonal
Bi_{2}O_{3}	γ phase	773-912 K or RT and 100 kPa (1 atm)	Body-centered cubic
Bi_{2}O_{3}	δ phase	912-1097 K and 100 kPa (1 atm)	FCC (Fm3̅m)
In_{2}O_{3}	Bixbyite-type phase	Ambient conditions	Cubic (Ia3̅)
In_{2}O_{3}	Corundum-type	15-25 GPa at 1273 K	Corundum-type Hexagonal (R3̅c)
In_{2}O_{3}	Rh_{2}O_{3}(II)-type	100 GPa and 1000 K	Orthorhombic
Al_{2}O_{3}	α phase	Ambient conditions	Corundum-type Trigonal (R3̅c)
Al_{2}O_{3}	γ phase	773 K and 100 kPa (1 atm)	Cubic (Fd3̅m)
SnO_{2}	α phase	Ambient conditions	Rutile-type Tetragonal (P42/mnm)
SnO_{2}	CaCl_{2}-type phase	15 kbar (1.5 GPa) at 1073 K	Orthorhombic, CaCl_{2}-type (Pnnm)
SnO_{2}	α-PbO_{2}-type	Above 18 kbar (1.8 GPa)	α-PbO_{2}-type (Pbcn)
TiO_{2}	Rutile	Equilibrium phase	Rutile-type Tetragonal
TiO_{2}	Anatase	Metastable phase (Not stable)	Tetragonal (I41/amd)
TiO_{2}	Brookite	Metastable phase (Not stable)	Orthorhombic (Pcab)
ZrO_{2}	Monoclinic phase	Ambient conditions	Monoclinic (P21/c)
ZrO_{2}	Tetragonal phase	Above 1443 K	Tetragonal (P42/nmc)
ZrO_{2}	Fluorite-type phase	Above 2643 K	Cubic (Fm3̅m)
MoO_{3}	α phase	553-673 K & 100 kPa (1 atm)	Orthorhombic (Pbnm)
MoO_{3}	β phase	553-673 K & 100 kPa (1 atm)	Monoclinic
MoO_{3}	h phase	High-pressure and high-temperature phase	Hexagonal (P6a/m or P6a)
MoO_{3}	MoO_{3}-II	60 kbar (6 GPa) and 973 K	Monoclinic
WO_{3}	ε phase	Up to 220 K	Monoclinic (Pc)
WO_{3}	δ phase	220-300 K	Triclinic (P1)
WO_{3}	γ phase	300-623 K	Monoclinic (P21/n)
WO_{3}	β phase	623-900 K	Orthorhombic (Pnma)
WO_{3}	α phase	Above 900 K	Tetragonal (P4/ncc)

==== Other inorganic compounds ====
A classical example of polymorphism is the pair of minerals calcite, which is rhombohedral, and aragonite, which is orthorhombic. Both are forms of calcium carbonate. A third form of calcium carbonate is vaterite, which is hexagonal and relatively unstable.

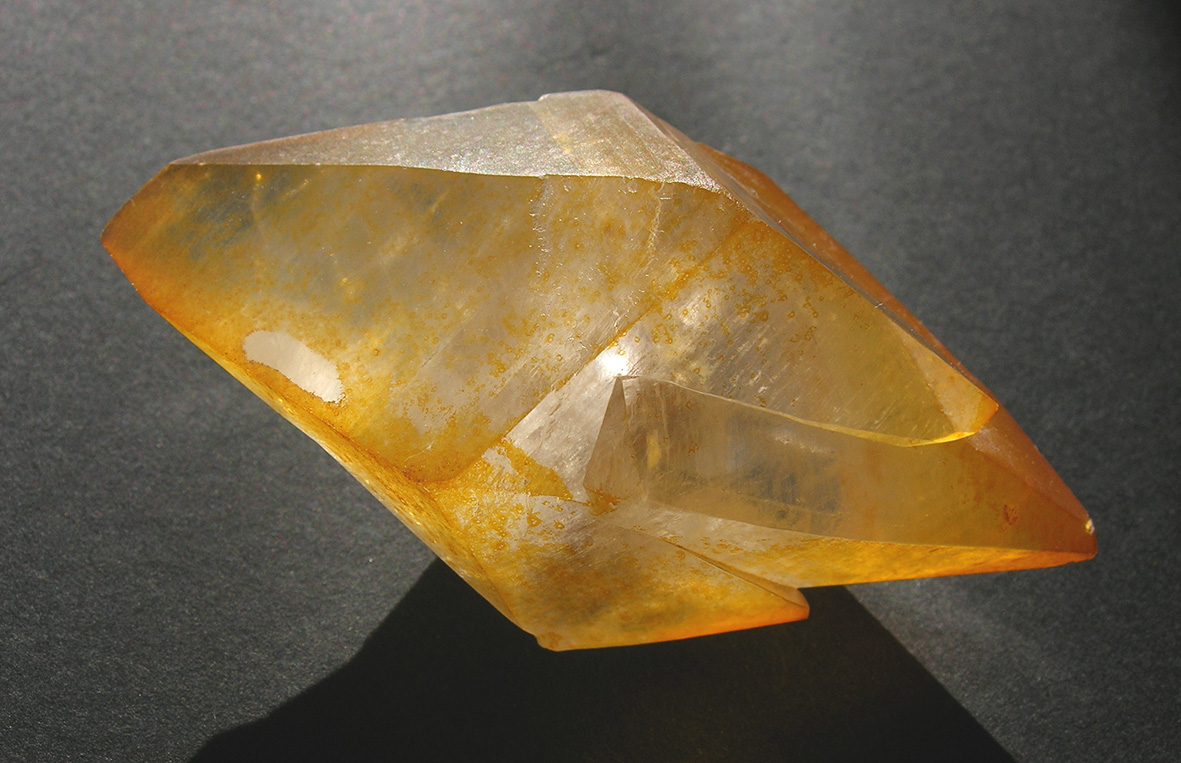
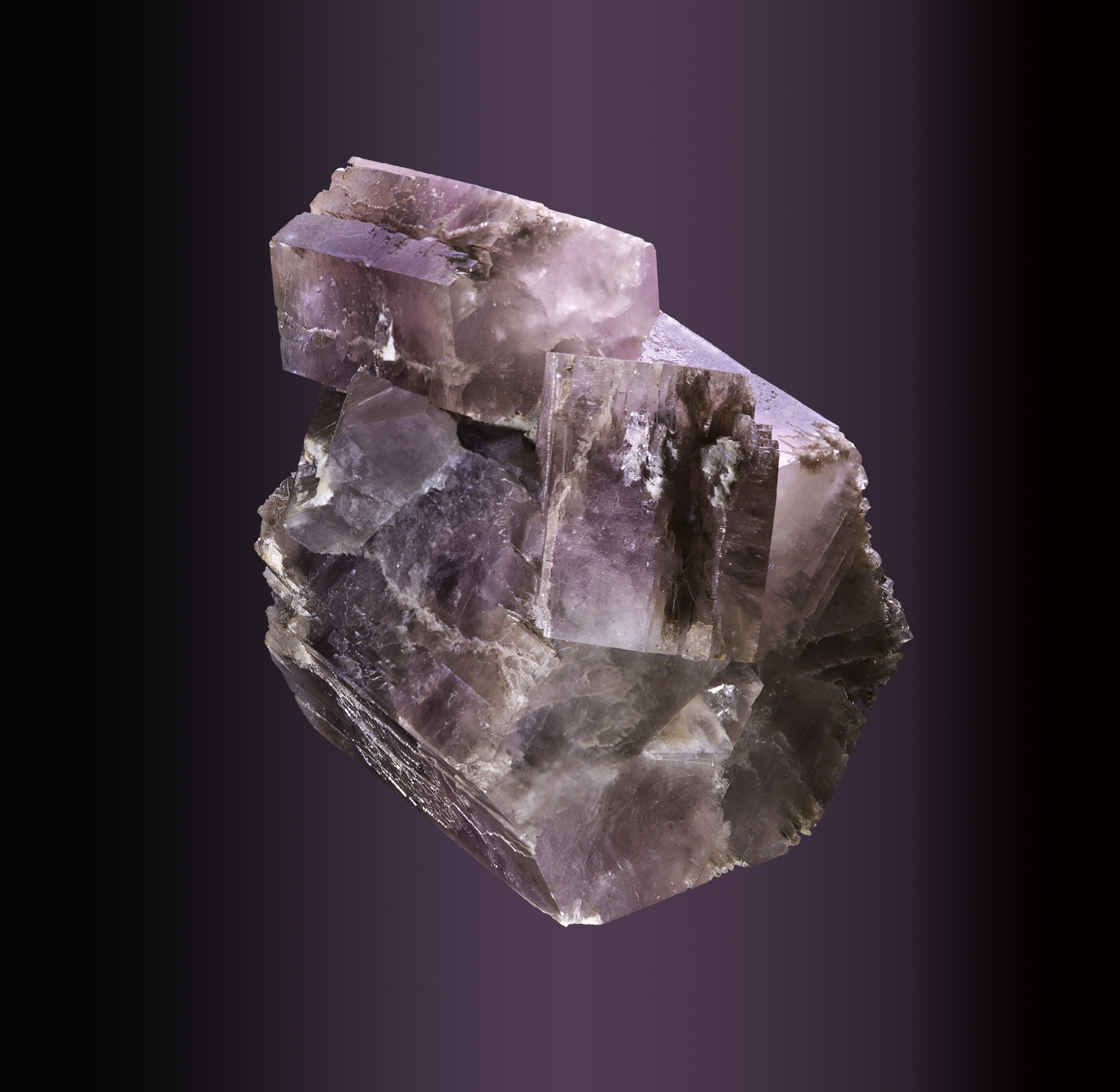
Calcite (on left) and Aragonite (on right), two forms of calcium carbonate. Note: the colors are from impurities.

β-HgS precipitates as a black solid when Hg(II) salts are treated with H_{2}S. With gentle heating of the slurry, the black polymorph converts to the red form.

== Factors affecting polymorphism ==
According to Ostwald's rule, usually less stable polymorphs crystallize before the stable form. The concept hinges on the idea that unstable polymorphs more closely resemble the state in solution, and thus are kinetically advantaged. The founding case of fibrous vs rhombic benzamide illustrates the case. Another example is provided by two polymorphs of titanium dioxide. Nevertheless, there are known systems, such as metacetamol, where only narrow cooling rate favors obtaining metastable form II.

Polymorphs have disparate stabilities. Some convert rapidly at room (or any) temperature. Most polymorphs of organic molecules only differ by a few kJ/mol in lattice energy. Approximately 50% of known polymorph pairs differ by less than 2 kJ/mol and stability differences of more than 10 kJ/mol are rare. Polymorph stability may change upon temperature or pressure. Importantly, structural and thermodynamic stability are different. Thermodynamic stability may be studied using experimental or computational methods.

Polymorphism is affected by the details of crystallisation. The solvent in all respects affects the nature of the polymorph, including concentration, other components of the solvent, i.e., species that inhibit or promote certain growth patterns. A decisive factor is often the temperature of the solvent from which crystallisation is carried out.

Metastable polymorphs are not always reproducibly obtained, leading to cases of "disappearing polymorphs", with usually negative implications on law and business.

== In pharmaceuticals ==
Approximately 37% or more of organic compounds exist as more than one polymorph. The existence of polymorphs has legal implications as drugs receive regulatory approval and are granted patents for only a single polymorph. In a classic patent dispute, the GlaxoSmithKline defended its patent for the Type II polymorph of the active ingredient in Zantac against competitors while that of the Type I polymorph had already expired. Polymorphism in drugs can also have direct medical implications since dissolution rates depend on the polymorph. The known cases up to 2015 are discussed in a review article by Bučar, Lancaster, and Bernstein.

=== Dibenzoxazepines ===
Clozapine exists in 4 forms compared to 60 forms for olanzapine.

=== Posaconazole ===
The original formulations licensed as Noxafil were formulated utilising form I of posaconazole. The discovery of polymorphs of posaconazole increased rapidly and resulted in much research in crystallography of posaconazole. A methanol solvate and a 1,4-dioxane co-crystal were added to the Cambridge Structural Database (CSD).

=== Ritonavir ===
The antiviral drug ritonavir exists as two polymorphs, which differ greatly in efficacy, and of which one is a disappearing polymorph. This caused considerable production difficulties and led to temporary withdrawal of the drug from the market. The issues were solved by reformulating the medicine into gelcaps and tablets, rather than the original capsules.

=== Aspirin ===
One polymorph ("Form I") of aspirin is common. "Form II" was reported in 2005, found after attempted co-crystallization of aspirin and levetiracetam from hot acetonitrile.

In form I, pairs of aspirin molecules form centrosymmetric dimers through the acetyl groups with the (acidic) methyl proton to carbonyl hydrogen bonds. In form II, each aspirin molecule forms the same hydrogen bonds, but with two neighbouring molecules instead of one. With respect to the hydrogen bonds formed by the carboxylic acid groups, both polymorphs form identical dimer structures. The aspirin polymorphs contain identical 2-dimensional sections and are therefore more precisely described as polytypes.

Pure Form II aspirin could be prepared by seeding the batch with aspirin anhydrate in 15% weight.

=== Paracetamol ===
Paracetamol powder has poor compression properties, which poses difficulty in making tablets. A second polymorph was found with more suitable compressive properties.

=== Cortisone acetate ===
Cortisone acetate exists in at least five different polymorphs, four of which are unstable in water and change to a stable form.

=== Pyrazinamide ===
Pyrazinamide has at least 4 polymorphs. All of them transforms to stable α form at room temperature upon storage or mechanical treatment. Recent studies prove that α form is thermodynamically stable at room temperature.

=== Additional examples ===
Carbamazepine, estrogen, paroxetine, and chloramphenicol also show polymorphism.

== Polytypism ==
Polytypes are a special case of polymorphs, where multiple close-packed crystal structures differ in one dimension only. Polytypes have identical close-packed planes, but differ in the stacking sequence in the third dimension perpendicular to these planes. Silicon carbide (SiC) has more than 170 known polytypes, although most are rare. All the polytypes of SiC have virtually the same density and Gibbs free energy. The most common SiC polytypes are shown in Table 1.

Table 1: Some polytypes of SiC.

Phase	Structure	Ramsdell notation	Stacking sequence	Comment
α-SiC	hexagonal	2H	AB	wurtzite form
α-SiC	hexagonal	4H	ABCB	
α-SiC	hexagonal	6H	ABCACB	the most stable and common form
α-SiC	rhombohedral	15R	ABCACBCABACABCB	
β-SiC	face-centered cubic	3C	ABC	sphalerite or zinc blende form

A second group of materials with different polytypes are the transition metal dichalcogenides, layered materials such as molybdenum disulfide (MoS_{2}). For these materials the polytypes have more distinct effects on material properties, e.g. for MoS_{2}, the 1T polytype is metallic in character, while the 2H form is more semiconducting. Another example is tantalum disulfide, where the common 1T as well as 2H polytypes occur, but also more complex 'mixed coordination' types such as 4Hb and 6R, where the trigonal prismatic and the octahedral geometry layers are mixed. Here, the 1T polytype exhibits a charge density wave, with distinct influence on the conductivity as a function of temperature, while the 2H polytype exhibits superconductivity.

ZnS and CdI_{2} are also polytypical. It has been suggested that this type of polymorphism is due to kinetics where screw dislocations rapidly reproduce partly disordered sequences in a periodic fashion.

== Theory ==
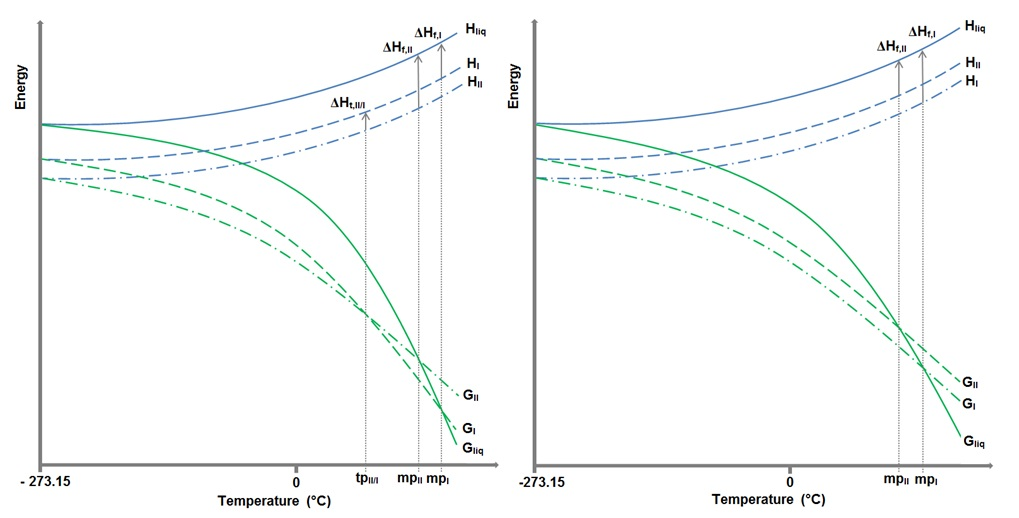
Solid phase transitions which transform reversibly without passing through the liquid or gaseous phases are called enantiotropic. In contrast, if the modifications are not convertible under these conditions, the system is monotropic. Experimental data are used to differentiate between enantiotropic and monotropic transitions and energy/temperature semi-quantitative diagrams can be drawn by applying several rules, principally the heat-of-transition rule, the heat-of-fusion rule and the density rule. These rules enable the deduction of the relative positions of the H and G isobars in the E/T diagram. [1]

In terms of thermodynamics, two types of polymorphic behaviour are recognized. For a monotropic system, plots of the free energies of the various polymorphs against temperature do not cross before all polymorphs melt. As a result, any transition from one polymorph to another below the melting point will be irreversible. For an enantiotropic system, a plot of the free energy against temperature shows a crossing point before the various melting points. It may also be possible to convert interchangeably between the two polymorphs by heating or cooling, or through physical contact with a lower energy polymorph.

A simple model of polymorphism is to model the Gibbs free energy of a ball-shaped crystal as $G = a r^2 - b r^3$. Here, the first term $ar^2$ is the surface energy, and the second term $-br^3$ is the volume energy. Both parameters $a, b > 0$. The function $G(r)$ rises to a maximum before dropping, crossing zero at $r_{crit}$. In order to crystallize, a ball of crystal much overcome the energetic barrier to the $r > r_{crit}$ part of the energy landscape.

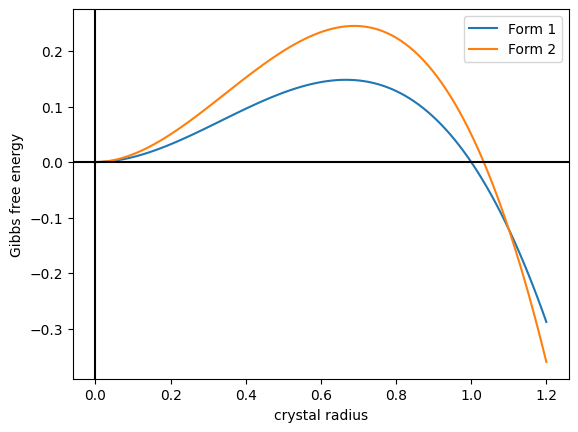
Figure 2

Now, suppose there are two kinds of crystals, with different energies $G_1 = a_1 r^2 - b_1 r^3$ and $G_2 = a_2 r^2 - b_2 r^3$, and if they have the same shape as in Figure 2, then the two curves intersect at some $r'_{crit} > r_{crit, 1}$. Then the system has three phases:

- $r < r_{crit, 1}$. Crystals tend to dissolve. Amorphous phase.
- $r_{crit, 1} < r < r'_{crit}$. Crystals tend to grow as form 1.
- $r > r'_{crit}$. Crystals tend to grow as form 2.

If the crystal is grown slowly, it could be kinetically stuck in form 1.

== See also ==
- Allotropy
- Isomorphism (crystallography)
- Dimorphism (Wiktionary)
- Polyamorphism
- Disappearing polymorphs
- Chemical crystallography before X-rays
