= Oxidative dissolution of silver nanoparticles =

Silver nanoparticles (AgNPs) act primarily through a process known as oxidative dissolution, wherein Ag+ ions are released through an oxidative mechanism. AgNPs have potentially vast applications within the fields of medicine, science, and food and drug industries due to their antimicrobial properties, low cytotoxicity in humans, and inexpensive cost.

== Mechanism ==
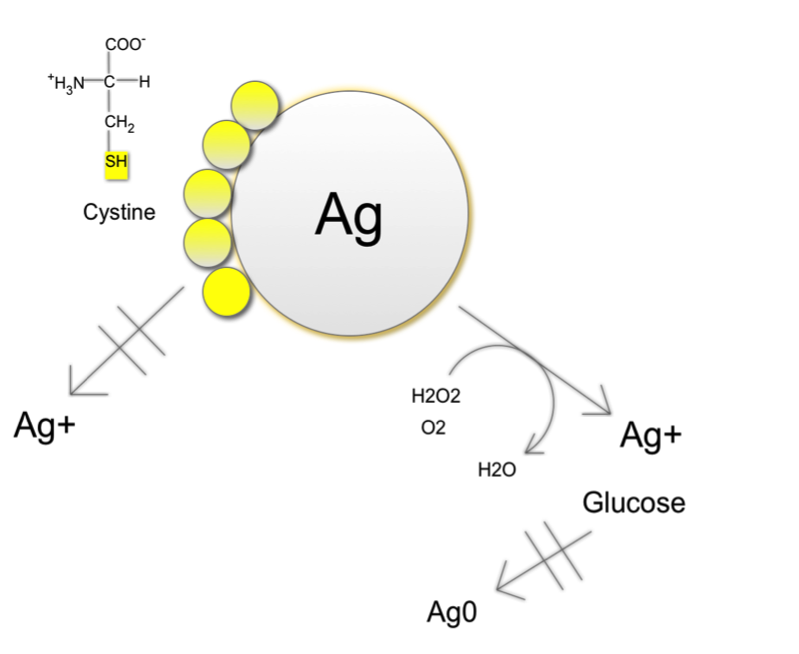
Oxidative dissolution of AgNPs is attenuated in biological systems by components found in the cytosol, such as cysteine and glucose.

Silver is stable in water and needs an oxidizing element to achieve oxidative dissolution. When oxidizing agents such as hydrogen peroxide or oxygen are present, they dissolute AgNPs to release Ag^{+}. The release of Ag^{+} leads to creation of reactive oxygen species (ROS) inside cells, which can further dissolute the nanoparticles. Some nano silver particles develop protective Ag_{3}OH surface groups and it is thought that dissolution removes these groups and forms oxygen radicals, which attenuate reactivity of the AgNPs by entering into the lattice to form a highly stable Ag_{6}O octahedral structure. It has been thought AgNP efficacy can mainly be attributed to shape, as nanoprisms and naorods have proven more active than nanospheres because they possess more highly exposed facets, thus leading to a faster release of Ag+ ions.

=== Environmental factors ===
Environmental factors that play a role in particle dissolution:

- pH (rate increases with increasing pH ( 6–8.5)),
- presence of halide ions (cause Ag^{+} precipitation),
- particle coating
- presence of reducing sugars.
- The presence of cysteine (inhibits dissolution).
- presence of natural organic matter.

== Synthesis ==
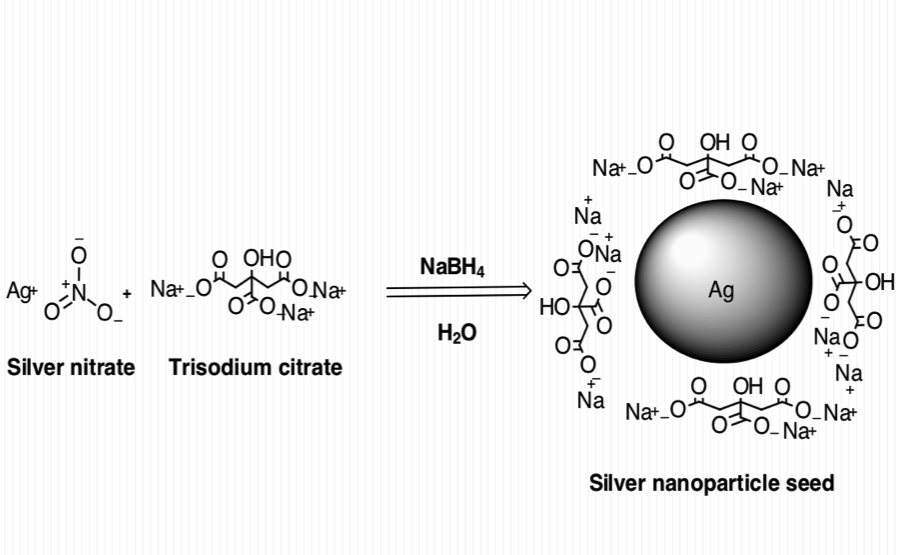
One method of generation of AgNPs is the reduction of the raw material, silver nitrate, to elemental silver using a reducing agent such as trisodium citrate.

AgNPs are synthesized using microwave irradiation, gamma irradiation UV activation, or conventional heating of the precursor silver nitrate, AgNO_{3} using an alginate solution as a stabilizing and reducing agent. The carboxyl or hydroxyl groups on the alginate reagent form complexes during the synthesis of the AgNPs that stabilize the reaction. Nanoparticle size and shape can be specified by changing the ratio of alginate to silver nitrate used and/or the pH. A coating such as PVP may be added to the nanoparticles by heating and subsequent slow cooling.

== Kinetics ==
Stopped-flow spectrometry has been used to characterize the chemical mechanism and kinetics of AgNPs. Oxidative dissolution of AgNPs has been shown to be a first order reaction with respect to both silver and hydrogen peroxide and is independent of particle size.

== Antimicrobial activity ==
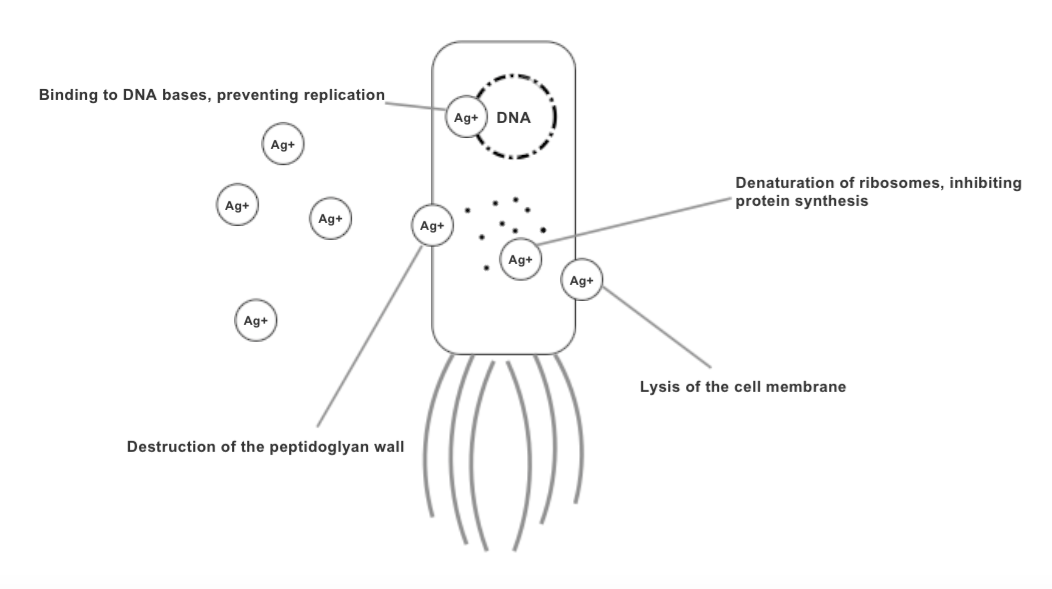
Oxidative dissolution of AgNPs leads to antimicrobial conditions. Ag+ destroys several metabolic mechanisms of bacteria, as it: binds to bases in the DNA, preventing cell replication, denatures ribosomes thereby preventing protein synthesis, lyses the bacterial cell membrane, and destroys bacterial peptidoglycan walls.

Antibacterial, antiviral and anti-fungal properties have been investigated in response to AgNP dissolution. Antibacterial activities of AgNPs are much stronger in oxygenic conditions than anoxic conditions. Through their oxidative dissolution in biological systems, AgNPs can target important biomolecules such as “DNA, peptides, and cofactors” as well as absorb into nonspecific moieties and simultaneously disrupt several metabolic pathways. They have been known to act as a bridging agent between thiols, to have affinity for organic amines and phosphates. The combination of silver ions’ reaction with biomolecules with oxidative stress, ultimately leads to toxicity in biological environment.

=== Inhibition of nitrification ===
Oxidative dissolution of AgNPs, which gives rise to Ag^{+}, potentially inhibits nitrification within Ammonia oxidizing bacteria. A key step in nitrification is the oxidation of ammonia to hydroxylamine (NH_{2}OH) catalyzed by the enzyme ammonia monooxyganase (AMO). The enzymatic activity of AMO is highly vulnerable to interference due to its intracytoplasmic location and its abundance of copper. It is speculated that Ag^{+} ions from AgNPs interfere with AMO's copper bonds by replacing copper with Ag^{+} causing a decrease in enzymatic activity, and thus nitrification.
