= Environmental impact of silver nanoparticles =

In 2015, 251 million tubes of toothpaste were sold in the United States. A single tube holds roughly 170 grams of toothpaste, so approximately 43 kilotonnes of toothpaste get washed into the water systems annually. Toothpaste contains silver nanoparticles, also known as nanosilver or AgNPs, among other compounds.

Each tube of toothpaste contains approximately 91 mg of silver nanoparticles, with approximately 3.9 tonnes of silver nanoparticles entering the environment annually. Silver nanoparticles are not entirely cleared from the water during the wastewater treatment process, possibly leading to detrimental environmental effects.

== Silver nanoparticles in toothpaste ==
Silver nanoparticles are used for catalyzing chemical reactions, Raman imaging, and antimicrobial sterilization. Along with its antimicrobial properties, its low mammalian cell toxicity makes these particles a common addition to consumer products. Washing textiles embedded with silver nanoparticles results in the oxidation and transformation of metallic Ag into AgCl.

Silver nanoparticles have different physicochemical characteristics from the free silver ion, Ag^{+} and possess increased optical, electromagnetic, and catalytic properties. Particles with one dimension of 100 nm or less can generate reactive oxygen species. Smaller particles less than 10 nm may pass through cellular membranes and accumulate within the cell. Silver nanoparticles were also found to attach to cellular membranes, eventually dissipating the proton motive force, leading to cell death.

Silver nanoparticles that are larger than the openings of membrane channel proteins can easily clog channels, leading to the disruption of membrane permeability and transport. However, the antimicrobial effectiveness of silver nanoparticles has been shown to decrease when dissolved in liquid media.

The free silver ion are potentially toxic to bacteria and planktonic species in the water. The positively charged silver ion can also attach to the negatively charged cell walls of bacteria, leading to deactivation of cellular enzymes, disruption of membrane permeability, and eventually, cell lysis and death. However, its toxicity to microorganisms is not overtly observed since the free silver ion is found in low concentrations in wastewater treatment systems and the natural environment due to its complexation with ligands such as chloride, sulfide, and thiosulfate.

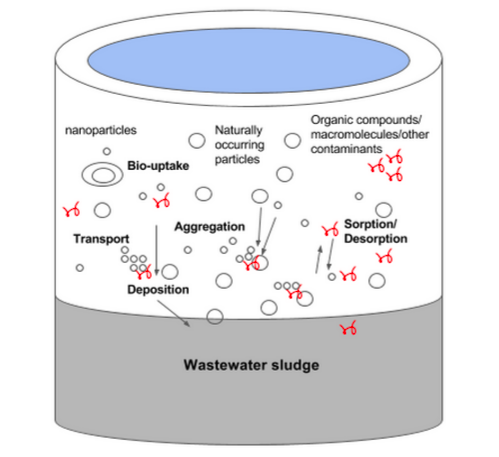
Some occurrences of interactions of AgNPs in wastewater treatment systems are depicted.

=== Wastewater treatment ===
A majority of silver nanoparticles in consumer products go down the drain and are eventually released into sewer systems and reach wastewater treatment plants. Primary screening and grit removal in wastewater treatment does not completely filter out silver nanoparticles, and coagulation treatment may lead to further condensation into wastewater sludge. The secondary wastewater treatment process involves suspended growth systems which allow bacteria to decompose organic matter within the water. Any silver nanoparticles still suspended in the water may collect on these microbes, potentially killing them due to their antimicrobial effects. After passing through both treatment processes, the silver nanoparticles are eventually deposited into the environment.

A majority of the submerged portions of wastewater treatment plants are anoxic and rich in sulfur. During the wastewater treatment process, silver nanoparticles either remain the same, are converted into free silver ions, complex with ligands, or agglomerate. Silver nanoparticles can also attach to wastewater biosolids found in both the sludge and the effluent. Silver ions in wastewater are removed efficiently because of their strong complexation with chloride or sulfide.

A majority of the silver found in wastewater treatment plant effluent is associated with reduced sulfur as organic thiol groups and inorganic sulfides. Silver nanoparticles also tend to accumulate in activated sludge, and the dominant form of the silver found in sewage sludge is Ag_{2}S. Therefore, most of the silver found in wastewater treatment plants is in the form of silver nanoparticles or silver precipitates such as Ag_{2}S and AgCl.

The amount of silver precipitate formed depends on silver ion release, which increases with increasing dissolved oxygen concentration and decreasing pH. Silver ions account for approximately 1% of total silver after silver nanoparticles are suspended in aerated water. In anoxic wastewater treatment environments, silver ion release is therefore often negligible, and most of the silver nanoparticles in wastewater remain in the original silver nanoparticle form. The presence of natural organic matter can also decrease oxidative dissolution rates and therefore the release rate of free silver ions. The slow oxidation of silver nanoparticles may enable new pathways for its transfer into the environment.

=== Transformation in the environment ===
The silver nanoparticles that pass through wastewater treatment plants undergo transformations in the environment through changes in aggregation state, oxidation state, precipitation of secondary phases, or sorption of organic species. These transformations can result in the formation of colloidal solutions. Each of these new species potentially have toxic effects which have yet to be fully examined.

Most silver nanoparticles in products have an organic shell structure around a core of Ag^{0}. This shell is often created with carboxylic acids functional groups, usually using citrate, leading to stabilization through adsorption or covalent attachment of organic compounds. In seawater, glutathione reacts with citrate to form a thioester via esterification.

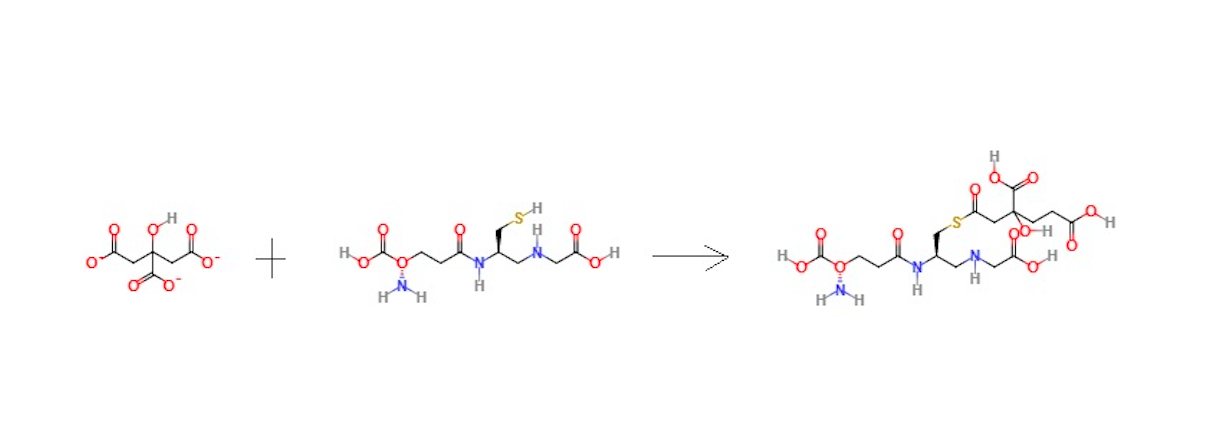
Esterification reaction of citrate and glutathione

Thioesters exhibit electrosteric repulsive forces due to amine functional groups and their size, which prevents aggregation. These electrostatic repulsive forces are weakened by counterions in solution, such as Ca^{2+} found in seawater. Ca^{2+} ions are naturally found in seawater due to the weathering of calcareous rocks, and allow for dissolution of the oxide-coated particle at low electrolyte concentrations.

This leads to the aggregation of silver nanoparticles onto thioesters in seawater. When aggregation occurs, the silver nanoparticles lose microbial toxicity, but have greater exposure in the environment for larger organisms. These effects have not been completely identified, but may be hazardous to an organism's health via biological magnification.

==== Chemical reactions in seawater ====
Solubility Products (K_{sp}) of Silver-Containing Solids
Ag_{2}O	4.00 × 10^{−11}
Ag_{2}CO_{3}	8.46 × 10^{−12}
AgCl	1.77 × 10^{−10}
Ag_{2}S	5.92 × 10^{−51}
Ag_{2}SO_{4}	1.20 × 10^{−5}

Silver nanoparticles are thermodynamically unstable in oxic environments. In seawater, silver oxide is not thermodynamically favored when chloride and sulfur are present. On the surface where O_{2} is present in much greater quantities than chloride or sulfur, silver reacts to form a silver oxide surface layer. This oxidation has been shown to occur in nanoparticles as well, despite their shell.

Dissolution of Ag_{2}O in Water:

Ag_{2}O + H_{2}O → 2Ag^{−} + 2OH^{−}

The nano-size of the particles aids in oxidation since their smaller surface area increases their redox potential. The silver oxide layer easily dissolves in water because of its low K_{sp} value of 4 × 10^{−11}.

Possible Oxidation Reactions of Silver:

Ag + O_{2} → Ag+ + O_{2}^{−}

4Ag + O_{2} → 4Ag^{+} + 2O_{2}^{−}

In aerobic, acidic seawater, oxidation of Ag can occur through the following reaction:

Oxidation of Silver in Seawater:

2Ag_{(s)} + ½ O_{2(aq)} + 2H^{+}_{(aq)} ⇌ 2Ag^{+}_{(aq)} + H2O_{(l)}

The formation of these Ag^{+} ions are a concern for environmental health, as these ions freely interact with other organic compounds, such as humic acids, and disrupt the normal balance of an ecosystem. These Ag^{+} ions will also react with Cl^{−} to form complexes such as AgCl_{2}^{−}, AgCl_{3}^{2−}, and AgCl_{4}^{3−}, which are bioavailable forms of silver that are potentially more toxic to bacteria and fish than silver nanoparticles. The etched structure of silver nanoparticles provides the chloride with the preferred atomic steps for nucleation to occur.

Reaction of Silver with Chloride:

Ag^{+} + Cl^{−} → AgCl

AgCl_{(s)} + Cl^{−}_{(aq)} → AgCl_{2}^{−}_{(aq)}

Ag has also been shown to readily react with sulfur in water. Free Ag^{+} ions will react with H_{2}S in the water to form the precipitate Ag_{2}S.

Silver and Sulfur Reaction in Seawater:

2Ag_{(aq)} + H_{2}S_{(aq)} → Ag_{2}S_{(s)} + H_{2(aq)}

H_{2}S is not the only source of sulfur that Ag will readily bind to. Organosulfur compounds, which are produced by aquatic organisms, form extremely stable sulfide complexes with silver. Silver outcompetes other metals for the available sulfide, leading to an overall decrease in bioavailable sulfur in the community. Thus, the formation of Ag_{2}S limits the amount of bioavailable sulfur and contributes to a reduction in toxicity of silver nanoparticles to nitrifying bacteria.

==== Effect on bacteria ====
Silver nanoparticles are experimentally shown to inhibit autotrophic nitrifying bacterial growth (86±3%) more than Ag^{+} ions (42±7%) or AgCl colloids (46±4%). Silver nanoparticle-inhibited heterotrophic growth (55±8%) in Escherichia coli is best observed at lower concentrations, between 1.0 uM and 4.2 uM. This is less than Ag^{+} ions (~100%), but greater than AgCl colloids (66±6%). The actual cause of these results is undetermined as growth conditions and cell properties differ between nitrifying bacteria and heterotrophic E. coli. Studies conducted in natural lake environments show less response from bacterioplankton than in laboratory environments when exposed to similar concentrations of silver nanoparticles. This may be due to the binding of free Ag^{+} ions to dissolved organic matter in lake environments, rendering the Ag^{+} unavailable.

Within toothpaste, Ag^{+} ions have been shown to have a stronger effect on gram-negative bacteria than on gram-positive bacteria. In comparison to other nanoparticles, such as gold, silver tends to have a broader antimicrobial effect, which is another reason why it is incorporated into so many products. Ag^{+} is less effective on gram-positive bacteria due to the thick layer of peptidoglycan around them that gram-negative species lack. Approximately half of the peptidoglycan wall is composed of teichoic acids linked by phosphodiester bonds, which results in an overall negative charge in the peptidoglycan layer. This negative charge may trap the positive Ag^{+} and prevent them from entering the cell and disrupting the flow of electrons.

==== Toxicology in aquatic environments ====
The most environmentally relevant species of these nanoparticles are silver chloride within marine ecosystems and organic thiols within terrestrial ecosystems. Once Ag^{0} enters the environment, it is oxidized to Ag^{+}. Of the potential species formed in seawater, such as Ag_{2}S and Ag_{2}CO_{3}, AgCl is the most thermodynamically favored due to its stability, solubility, and the abundance of Cl^{−} in seawater. Research has shown that partially oxidized nanoparticles may be more toxic than those that are freshly prepared.

It was also found that Ag dissolutes more in solution when the pH is low and bleaching has occurred. This effect, coupled with ocean acidification and increasing coral reef bleaching events, leads to a compounding effect of Ag accumulation in the global marine ecosystem. These free formed Ag^{+} ions can accumulate and block the regulation of Na^{+} and Cl^{−} ion exchange within the gills of fish, leading to blood acidosis which is fatal if left unchecked. Additionally, fish can accumulate Ag through their diet. Phytoplankton, which form the base level of aquatic food chains, can absorb and collect silver from their surroundings.

As fish eat phytoplankton, the silver accumulates within their circulatory system, which has been shown to negatively impact embryonic fish, causing spinal cord deformities and cardiac arrhythmia. The other class of organisms heavily affected by silver nanoparticles is bivalves. Filter feeding bivalves accumulate nanoparticles to concentrations 10,000 times greater than was added to seawater, and Ag^{+} ions are proven to be extremely toxic to them.

The base of complex food webs consists of microbes, and these organisms are most heavily impacted by nanoparticles. These effects cascade into the problems that have now reached an observable scale. As global temperatures rise and oceanic pH drops, some species, such as oysters, will be even more susceptible to the negative impacts of nanoparticles as they are stressed.

== See also ==
- Environmental impact of pharmaceuticals and personal care products
- Plastic resin pellet pollution
