= Disappearing polymorph =

Phenomenon in materials science

Needles of two different polymorphs of metanilic acid taken under a microscope at 20× magnification. Figure (a) shows Form II and (b) shows Form III; Form I was unable to be reproduced by researchers, an instance of a disappearing polymorph.

In materials science, a disappearing polymorph is a form of a crystal structure (a morph) that is suddenly unable to be produced, instead transforming into a different crystal structure with the same chemical composition (a polymorph) during nucleation. Sometimes the resulting transformation is extremely hard or impractical to reverse, because the new polymorph may be more stable. That is, they are metastable forms that have been replaced by more stable forms.

It is hypothesized that contact with a single microscopic seed crystal of the new polymorph can be enough to start a chain reaction causing the transformation of a much larger mass of material. Widespread contamination with such microscopic seed crystals may lead to the impression that the original polymorph has "disappeared". In a few cases, such as progesterone and paroxetine hydrochloride, the disappearance gradually spread across the world, and it is suspected that it is because Earth's atmosphere has over time become permeated with tiny seed crystals. It is believed that seeds as small as a few million molecules (about 10^{−15} grams) are sufficient for converting one morph to another, making unwanted disappearance of morphs particularly difficult to prevent. It is hypothesized that "unintentional seeding" may also be responsible for a related phenomenon, where a previously difficult-to-crystallize compound becomes easier to crystallize over time.

Although it may seem like a so-called disappearing polymorph can no longer be produced at all, it is believed that it is always possible in principle to reconstruct the original polymorph in a lab that has not been contaminated by the new morph. This was demonstrated in the ranitidine case. However, doing so is usually impractical or uneconomical. In some cases, the original morph can be reconstructed by a different pathway with different chemical kinetics, as in the case of progesterone.

This is of concern to the pharmaceutical industry, where disappearing polymorphs can ruin the effectiveness of their products and make it impossible to manufacture the original product if there is any contamination. There have been cases in which a laboratory that attempted to reproduce crystals of a particular structure instead grew not the original but a new crystal structure. The drug paroxetine was subject to a lawsuit that hinged on such a pair of polymorphs, and multiple life-saving drugs, such as ritonavir, have been recalled due to unexpected polymorphism.

== Thermodynamics ==
The initial polymorph is in a metastable state (1), which requires overcoming an energy threshold (2) to make it transform into a more stable polymorph with a stronger bond (3). Once (3) exists in a solution during nucleation, the resulting crystal will take the form of the more stable polymorph, making (1) nearly impossible to produce in a typical laboratory environment.

The Gibbs phase rule states that, under most thermodynamic conditions (fixed temperature, pressure, chemical potential, and other intensive thermodynamic properties), for each chemical species, only one phase is thermodynamically stable (i.e. have the lowest Gibbs free energy per volume), except on certain boundaries, such as the coexistence of ice and water right at the freezing point. In particular, since each crystal morph is a phase of matter, this implies that under normal circumstances, there exists only a single crystal morph at thermodynamic equilibrium. However, some phases may be kinetically stable, even if not energetically so.

Disappearing polymorphs occur when there are two morphs of a substance, and one morph has lower Gibbs free energy, but is kinetically slower to form. Thus, when the crystal is first formed, the kinetically faster morph occurs first. Eventually, by accident or catalysis, the other morph occurs, which can then serve as seed crystal. More abstractly stated, disappearing polymorphs are morphs that are kinetically stable but not thermodynamically stable.

Gibbs free energy of crystallization.

In detail, consider the classical nucleation theory of crystallization of water into ice. When liquid water is held just below the freezing point, the relative change in Gibbs free energy for a sphere of ice (relative to an equivalent amount in water) with radius $r$ is
$$\Delta G=\frac{4\pi}{3} V_0 r^3 + 4\pi A_0 r^2,$$
where $V_0$ is the change in free energy per volume, and $A_0$ is the change in free energy per surface area (the interfacial energy, or surface tension). The term $A_0$ is usually positive, since there is an energy penalty for the boundary between two different phases of matter. However, as water crosses from above to below freezing point, $V_0$ turns from positive to negative.

The critical radius, $r_{crit}$, satisfies $\frac{d}{d r} \Delta G \Bigg|_{r=r_{crit}} = 0$. A ball of ice with $r < r_{crit}$ tends to shrink, but a ball of ice with $r > r_{crit}$ tends to grow. A perfectly homogeneous liquid water below the freezing point may thus remain indefinitely liquid, until a single seed crystal of ice appears with $r > r_{crit}$, after which it would grow without limit. Similarly, dirt within the water that is attracted to ice would have a negative interfacial energy with ice, which allows an initial seed crystal to form around dirt particles. This competition between kinetics and stability allows the supercooling effect, whereby a clean liquid water without dirt or seed crystals may remain indefinitely in a liquid state. It also allows cloud seeding.

Gibbs free energy of competing polymorphs.

When there are two morphs A and B, it is possible for the $\Delta G_A$ and $\Delta G_B$ curves to cross over at different points, as illustrated. In this case, morph B crystals are energetically favored when small, but for a large enough crystal, morph A is energetically favored. This means that during crystallization, morph B tends to appear first, which then may grow without bound—that is, morph B is kinetically favored. However, it is a metastable crystal. If a seed crystal of morph A above the crossover radius $r_{AB}$ is already present, morph A would outcompete morph B.

Benzamide illustrates this process. Justus von Liebig and Friedrich Wöhler observed that when a boiling water solution of benzamide is cooled slowly, a metastable morph appears as a "white mass of silky needles". Later, a different crystal morph would appear within as small cavities, and expand into the entire mass after a few days.

== Pharmaceutical and legal impact ==
In the United States, the first company to develop a drug ("pioneer") must demonstrate that the drug is safe and effective by extensive and expensive trials. After that, there would be a period of exclusive rights to sell the drug, after which other companies ("generics") can market the same drug as a generic chemical under the Abbreviated New Drug Application. The pioneer companies often attempt to evergreen the patent drug by many methods. Since the appearance of generics can decrease the revenue rate of patented drugs by as much as 80%, this is very profitable.

When disappearing polymorphs are involved, it is sometimes true that the pioneer company first discovered and patented polymorph A, then polymorph B, but polymorph A inevitably converts to polymorph B when seeded with microscopic amounts of B. This then means that later companies, even if they follow all the steps specified by the pioneering patent, end up with a polymorph B. Since with disappearing polymorphism, it is practically impossible for anyone to produce the original drug without it turning into the new one, producers are effectively barred from selling generics until the patent for the new polymorph has run out. (Note: Legally, patents on pharmaceutical molecules usually specify the molecule by the location and amplitude of peaks in its X-ray diffraction spectrum, infrared spectrum, and other spectrographic data. The United States Pharmacopoeia states that two preparations of the same molecule usually have spectra with peaks at the same locations up to ± 0.10 degree, but relative intensities may vary up to 20%.) Alternatively, they may try to argue that a new polymorph needs to undergo the same trials as new drugs, potentially delaying release of a generic for years.

== Case studies ==
=== Paroxetine hydrochloride ===
Paroxetine hydrochloride was developed in the 1970s by scientists at Ferrosan and patented as US4007196A in 1976. Ferrosan licensed this patent to the Beecham Group, which later merged into GSK (GlaxoSmithKline at the time).

The paroxetine developed at that time was paroxetine anhydrate, which is a chalky powder that was hygroscopic. This made it difficult to handle. In late 1984, while scaling up the production of paroxetine, a new crystal form (hemihydrate) suddenly appeared at two Beecham sites in the UK within a few weeks of each other. In the presence of water or humidity, mere contact with hemihydrate converts anhydrate into hemihydrate.

Alan Curzons, working for GSK, wrote down the "Paroxetine Polymorphism" memorandum on May 29, 1985, a memorandum vital to later litigation.

When the patent for paroxetine anhydrate (the "original" polymorph) ran out, other companies wanted to make generic antidepressants using the chemical. The problem was that, by the time other companies began manufacturing, Earth's atmosphere was already seeded with microscopic quantities of paroxetine hemihydrate from GSK's manufacturing plants, which meant that anyone trying to manufacture the original polymorph would find it transformed into the still-patented version, which GSK refused to give manufacturing rights for. Thus, GSK sued the Canadian generic pharmaceutical company Apotex (SmithKline Beecham Corp. v Apotex Corp) for patent infringement by producing quantities of the newer paroxetine polymorph in their generic pills, asking for their products to be blocked from entering the market.

GSK claimed that the anhydrate "inevitably" converts to hemihydrate due to the presence of seeds. Apotex rejected the seeding theory as "junk science" and "alchemy". Both the District Court and the Federal Circuit Court accepted the seeding theory of GSK, but nevertheless both judged in favor of Apotex. The District Court judged that Apotex was not responsible for unintentional presence of seeding in facility. The Federal Circuit Court invalidated the newer patent concerning the hemihydrates, on the argument of prior public use from the clinical trials.

Later research showed that the "anhydrate" was in fact a non-stoichiometric hydrate that rapidly dehydrates and rehydrates. The hemihydrate form is more stable due to a higher number of hydrogen bonds.

=== Paroxetine mesylate ===
In order to avoid patents on paroxetine hydrochloride, some companies developed alternative salts of paroxetine. In the mid-1990s SmithKline Beecham (now a part of GSK) and Synthon independently developed paroxetine mesylate. They obtained two separate patents.

Subsequently, all attempts to produce Synthon's version of paroxetine mesylate ended up with Beecham's version. There were two possibilities: either Synthon's version is a disappearing polymorph, or Synthon's patent application contained erroneous data. Many litigations later, there is still no legal consensus on which possibility is correct.

=== Ritonavir ===
Released to the public in 1996, ritonavir is an antiretroviral medication used to help treat HIV/AIDS. It has been listed on the World Health Organization's List of Essential Medicines. The original medication was manufactured in the form of semisolid gel capsules, based on the only known crystal form of the drug ("Form I"). In 1998, however, a second crystal form ("Form II") was unexpectedly discovered. It had significantly lower solubility and was not medically effective. Subsequent research showed that the two forms are conformational polymorphs, with Form II more thermodynamically stable since "all of the strong hydrogen bond donors and acceptors have been satisfied".

Form II was of sufficiently lower energy that it became impossible to produce Form I in any laboratory where Form II was introduced, even indirectly. Scientists who had been exposed to Form II in the past seemingly contaminated entire manufacturing plants by their presence, probably because they carried over microscopic seed crystals of the new polymorph. The drug was temporarily recalled from the market. Tens of thousands of AIDS patients went without medication for their condition (unless they switched to a Norvir liquid suspension) until ritonavir was reformulated as a capsule, approved, and re-released to the market in 1999. It is estimated that Abbott, the company which produced ritonavir under the brand name Norvir, lost over US$250 million as a result of the incident.

It was a serious public-relations problem for Abbott, so the company held interviews and press conferences, at which senior Abbott officials answered questions. The transcripts are archived at .

A later study found 3 additional morphs: a metastable polymorph, a trihydrate, and a formamide solvate.

=== Rotigotine ===
Rotigotine (sold under the brand name Neupro, among others) is a dopamine agonist indicated for the treatment of Parkinson's disease (PD) and restless legs syndrome (RLS). In 2007, the Neupro patch was approved by the Food and Drug Administration (FDA) as the first transdermal patch treatment of Parkinson's disease in the United States. The drug had been established in 1980, and no prior polymorphism had been observed. In 2008, a more stable polymorph unexpectedly emerged, which was described as resembling "snow-like crystals". The new polymorph did not display any observable reduction in efficacy, but nonetheless, Schwarz Pharma recalled all Neupro patches in the United States and some in Europe. Those with remaining patches in Europe were told to refrigerate their stock, since refrigeration seemed to reduce crystallization rates. The patch was reformulated in 2012, as per FDA recommendations, and was reintroduced in the United States without requiring refrigeration.

=== Progesterone ===
Progesterone is a naturally occurring steroid hormone and is used in hormone therapy and birth control pills, among other applications. There are two known forms of naturally occurring progesterone (or nat‐progesterone), and other synthetic polymorphs of the hormone have also been created and studied.

Early scientists reported being able to crystallize both Form 1 and Form 2 of nat‐progesterone, and they could convert Form 2 into Form 1, which has higher melting point (129–131 °C instead of 121–123 °C), and is more thermodynamically stable by heat capacity experiments. When later scientists tried to crystallize Form 2 from pure materials, they could not. Attempts to replicate older instructions (and variations on those instructions) for crystallization of Form 2 invariably produced Form 1 instead, sometimes even leading to crystals of exceptional purity but still of Form 1. Researchers have tentatively suggested that Form 2 became harder to produce already by 1975, based on a review of production difficulties documented or alluded to in existing literature.

Form 2 was eventually successfully synthesized by using pregnenolone, a structurally similar compound, as an additive in the crystallization process. The additive seemed to reverse the order of stability of the polymorphs. Multiple theories were proposed for why earlier research was able to produce Form 2 from "pure" ingredients, ranging from the possibility that the early researchers were unintentionally working with impure materials to the possibility that seed crystals of Form 1 had become more common in the atmosphere of laboratories since the 1970s.

=== Beta-melibiose ===
Pfanstiehl Chemical Company, in Waukegan, Illinois, was known for isolating and purifying natural substances, including melibiose. The final step of purifying melibiose was to crystallize it. However, one day, all new melibiose crystals appeared in a different morph. The old morph was called beta-melibiose and the new morph, alpha-melibiose. The chemists theorized that tiny traces of the alpha morph in the air or on the lab equipment could be causing this change, but they never found out where the contamination was coming from. Ultimately, the company gave up. However, they suggested that if the process were attempted in a different location, where there was absolutely no trace of alpha morph, then it might still be possible to successfully crystallize the beta morph. As of 1995, this issue was probably still present, since a survey of catalogs from various chemical companies including Merck, Fluka Chemie AG, BDH Chemicals, Aldrich, and Sigma, only the alpha-melibiose was available.

Beta-melibiose is in fact an epimer of alpha-melibiose. However, since when in solution, alpha- and beta-melibiose rapidly convert to each other, this may still be productively considered a case of crystal polymorphism.

=== Xylitol ===
Xylitol, a type of sugar alcohol, was first synthesized from beech wood chips in September 1890 in the form of syrups, but no one reported its crystal forms for 50 years. It has two different crystal morphs. One is a metastable, moisture-absorbing form that melts at 61 °C, and the other is a more stable form that melts at 94 °C. Notably, its metastable morph was prepared before the stable form, conforming to Ostwald's rule.

When a sample of xylitol in the metastable form is brought into a lab where the stable form had previously been made, the sample would change into the stable form after a few days in the open air. The structure of only the stable crystal was determined by X-ray diffraction in a 1969 publication. The researchers failed to obtain the metastable form from a solution in alcohol, either at room temperature or near freezing; they invariably grew only the stable form. This seems to be because once the stable form has been made in a lab, its seeds or nuclei can disperse in air, influencing new crystals to grow the same way.

=== Cephadroxil ===
Cefadroxil is an antibiotic. Bristol-Myers Squibb (BMS) patented the "Bouzard form" under US Patent No. 4,504,657 ('657) in 1985. The patenting took 6 years due to disputes about polymorphs. An earlier patent (US Patent No. 3,781,282) covered a different form, the "Micetich form". Attempts to replicate the Micetich form according to Example 19 in the '282 patent consistently yielded the Bouzard form, leading to challenges that the '657 patent was already inherent in the '282 patent, thus invalidated by prior art. BMS argued that the prevalence of the Bouzard form in manufacturing facilities led to unintentional seeding. Experimental tests of the seeding theory were ambiguous, but eventually the patent was granted.

Later, Zenith Laboratories marketed a cefadroxil hemihydrate. BMS sued for "gastrointestinal infringement", claiming it converted to the patented Bouzard form in the stomach. The case hinged on the interpretation of X-ray diffraction data, with BMS arguing it demonstrated the presence of the Bouzard form in patients who ingested Zenith's product. However, the court sided with Zenith.

=== Ranitidine ===
Three tautomers of ranitidine: enamine, imine, and nitronic acid. Each can exist as E/Z isomers.

Ranitidine, a medicine for peptic ulcers sold under the name of Zantac, was developed by Allen & Hanburys (then a part of Glaxo Group Research, now GSK), and patented in 1978 (US4128658A, Example 32). Originally, its crystals were all in Form 1, but the batch prepared on April 15, 1980 exhibited a new infrared spectrogram peak at 1045 cm^{−1}, demonstrating that a new crystal had appeared, designated Form 2. Subsequent batches produced more and more Form 2 despite using the same procedure, until Form 1 completely disappeared. The group patented Form 2 in 1985 (US4521431A) and 1987 (US4672133A).

Though it is very difficult to crystallize Form 1 in the presence of seeds of Form 2, if the two forms are already crystallized, then they can coexist indefinitely when mixed together. Later research showed that the two forms consists of different conformers of ranitidine, making this a case of conformational polymorphism. Specifically, the nitroethenediamine moiety of the ranitidine cations is rotated in different directions in the two forms. Also, that moiety is more disordered in Form 2.

As the 1978 patent was nearing its 1995 expiration, many generics companies attempted to develop generics using the procedure described in 1978 patent, but they all ended up with Form 2. Some generics companies (such as Novopharm) claimed that Glaxo never produced Form 1, and thus the 1978 patent inherently anticipated Form 2, thus invalidating the 1985 and 1987 patents (since double patenting is invalid). If the argument holds, then Form 2 could be marketed as generics in 1995 at the expiration of the 1978 patent. Since an additional seven years of exclusive marketing is highly profitable, Glaxo fought back.

In order to win the first Glaxo, Inc. v. Novopharm, Ltd case, Glaxo argued successfully that Form 1 could be produced according to the 1978 patent procedure in a carefully quarantined environment, and that Novopharm had been producing Form 2 due to disappearing polymorphs. The organic chemist Jack Baldwin, acting as a witness to Glaxo, had two of his postdoctoral researchers, for three times, produce Form 1 according to the 1978 patent procedure. Consequently, the court ruled that the 1985 patent is valid and covers Form 2.

Subsequent to losing the case, Novopharm attempted to bring Form 1 to market, so Glaxo sued them again in the second Glaxo, Inc. v. Novopharm, Ltd case. Glaxo argued that Novopharm could not market generics containing even trace amounts of Form 2. In particular, that means any generic Zantac containing an infrared spectrogram peak at 1045 cm^{−1} infringes their 1985 patent. However, during the prosecution of the first case, Glaxo had already accepted that the 1985 patent covered only products containing chemicals with a specific, 29-peak infrared (IR) spectrum. This was intended to avoid double patenting—Glaxo had to emphasize the unique aspects of Form 2 to distinguish it from the invention described in the 1978 patent. Since Glaxo could not establish the presence of the 29-peak IR spectrogram in Novopharm's product, the court ruled in favor of Novopharm.

... the claims at issue all identify Form 2 RHCl by reference to a 29-peak IR spectrum... proof of infringement requires proof that the drug alleged to infringe would exhibit all of those peaks, not a single, potentially meaningless peak.

— 110 F. 3d 1562 – Glaxo Inc v. Novopharm Ltd

== In fiction ==
The atoms had begun to stack and lock—to freeze—in a different fashion. The liquid that was crystallizing hadn't changed, but the crystals it was forming were, as far as industrial applications went, pure junk... The seed, which had come from God-only-knows where, taught the atoms the novel way in which to stack and lock, to crystallize, to freeze.

— Kurt Vonnegut, Cat's Cradle, Ice-Nine

In the 1963 novel Cat's Cradle, by Kurt Vonnegut, the narrator learns about ice-nine, an alternative structure of water that is solid at room temperature and acts as a seed crystal upon contact with ordinary liquid water, causing that liquid water to instantly freeze and transform into more ice-nine. Later in the book, a character frozen in ice-nine falls into the sea. Instantly, all the water in the world's seas, rivers, and groundwater transforms into solid ice-nine, leading to a climatic doomsday scenario.

== See also ==
- Crystal structure prediction
- Dynamical system
- Memetics
- Metastability
- Ostwald's rule of stages
- Protein folding#Misfolded proteins
  - Prion
  - Protein folding#Energy landscape of protein folding
  - Proteinopathy#Seeded induction
- Schild's Ladder
- Self-replicating machine
- Self-replication
- Strangelet#Potential propagation
