= Critical radius =

Critical radius is the minimum particle size from which an aggregate is thermodynamically stable. In other words, it is the lowest radius formed by atoms or molecules clustering together (in a gas, liquid or solid matrix) before a new phase inclusion (a bubble, a droplet or a solid particle) is viable and begins to grow. Formation of such stable nuclei is called nucleation.

At the beginning of the nucleation process, the system finds itself in an initial phase. Afterwards, the formation of aggregates or clusters from the new phase occurs gradually and randomly at the nanoscale. Subsequently, if the process is feasible, the nucleus is formed. Notice that the formation of aggregates is conceivable under specific conditions. When these conditions are not satisfied, a rapid creation-annihilation of aggregates takes place and the nucleation and posterior crystal growth process does not happen.

In precipitation models, nucleation is generally a prelude to models of the crystal growth process. Sometimes precipitation is rate-limited by the nucleation process. An example would be when someone takes a cup of superheated water from a microwave and, when jiggling it with a spoon or against the wall of the cup, heterogeneous nucleation occurs and most of water particles convert into steam.

If the change in phase forms a crystalline solid in a liquid matrix, the atoms might then form a dendrite. The crystal growth continues in three dimensions, the atoms attaching themselves in certain preferred directions, usually along the axes of a crystal, forming a characteristic tree-like structure of a dendrite.

== Mathematical derivation ==
The critical radius of a system can be determined from its Gibbs free energy.

$\Delta G_T = \Delta G_V + \Delta G_S$

It has two components, the volume energy $\Delta G_V$ and the surface energy $\Delta G_S$. The first one describes how probable it is to have a phase change and the second one is the amount of energy needed to create an interface.

The mathematical expression of $\Delta G_V$ , considering spherical particles, is given by:

$\Delta G_V = \frac{4}{3}\pi r^3 \Delta g_v$

where $\Delta g_v$ is the Gibbs free energy per volume and obeys $-\infty < \Delta g_v < \infty$. It is defined as the energy difference between one system at a certain temperature and the same system at the fusion temperature and it depends on pressure, the number of particles and temperature: $\Delta g_v (T,p,N)$. For a low temperature, far from the fusion point, this energy is big (it is more difficult to change the phase) and for a temperature close to the fusion point it is small (the system will tend to change its phase).

Regarding $\Delta G_S$ and considering spherical particles, its mathematical expression is given by:

Free energy change versus the nanoparticle radius. Below the critical radius, the clusters are not big enough to start the nucleation process. The Gibbs free energy change is positive and the process is not prosperous. This critical radius corresponds to the minimum size at which a particle can survive in solution without being redissolved. Above the critical radius, the particles will form and grow as it is thermodynamically favourable.

$\Delta G_S = 4\pi r^2 \gamma > 0$

where $\gamma$ is the surface tension we need to break to create a nucleus. The value of the $\Delta G_S$ is never negative as it always takes energy to create an interface.

The total Gibbs free energy is therefore:

$\Delta G_T=-\frac{4 \pi}{3} r^3 \Delta g_v + 4 \pi r^2 \gamma$

The critical radius $r_c$ is found by optimization, setting the derivative of $\Delta G_T$ equal to zero.

$\frac{d\Delta G_T}{dr}=-4\pi r_c^2 \Delta g_v+ 8 \pi r_c \gamma = 0$

yielding

$r_c = \frac{2\gamma}{|\Delta g_v|}$,

where $\gamma$ is the surface tension and $|\Delta g_v|$ is the absolute value of the Gibbs free energy per volume.

The Gibbs free energy of nuclear formation is found replacing the critical radius expression in the general formula.

$\Delta G_c = \frac{16\pi\gamma^3}{3(\Delta g_v)^2}$

== Interpretation ==
When the Gibbs free energy change is positive, the nucleation process will not be prosperous. The nanoparticle radius is small, the surface term prevails the volume term $\Delta G_S > \Delta G_V$. Contrary, if the variation rate is negative, it will be thermodynamically stable. The size of the cluster surpasses the critical radius. In this occasion, the volume term overcomes the superficial term $\Delta G_S < \Delta G_V$.

From the expression of the critical radius, as the Gibbs volume energy increases, the critical radius will decrease and hence, it will be easier achieving the formation of nuclei and begin the crystallization process.

== Methods for reducing the critical radius ==
=== Supercooling ===
In order to decrease the value of the critical radius $r_c$ and promote nucleation, a supercooling or superheating process may be used.

Supercooling is a phenomenon in which the system's temperature is lowered under the phase transition temperature without the creation of the new phase. Let $\Delta T = T_f - T$ be the temperature difference, where $T_f$ is the phase transition temperature. Let $\Delta g_v = \Delta h_v - T \Delta s_v$ be the volume Gibbs free energy, enthalpy and entropy respectively.

When $T = T_f$, the system has null Gibbs free energy, so:

$\Delta g_{f,v} = 0 \Leftrightarrow \Delta h_{f,v} = T_f \Delta s_{f,v}$

In general, the following approximations can be done:

$\Delta h_v \rightarrow \Delta h_{f,v}$ and $\Delta s_v \rightarrow \Delta s_{f,v}$

Consequently:

$\Delta g_v \simeq \Delta h_{f,v} - T\Delta s_{f,v} = \Delta h_{f,v} - \frac{T\Delta h_{f,v}}{T_f} = \Delta h_{f,v} \frac{T_f - T}{T_f}$

So:

$\Delta g_v = \Delta h_{f,v} \frac{\Delta T}{T_f}$

Substituting this result on the expressions for $r_c$ and $\Delta G_c$, the following equations are obtained:

$r_c = \frac{2 \gamma T_f}{\Delta h_{f,v}} \frac{1}{\Delta T}$

$\Delta G_c = \frac{16 \pi \gamma ^3 T_f^2}{3 (\Delta h_{f,v})^2} \frac{1}{(\Delta T)^2}$

Notice that $r_c$ and $\Delta G_c$ diminish with an increasing supercooling. Analogously, a mathematical derivation for the superheating can be done.

=== Supersaturation ===
Supersaturation is a phenomenon where the concentration of a solute exceeds the value of the equilibrium concentration.

From the definition of chemical potential $\Delta \mu = - k_B T ln \left(\frac{c_0}{c_{eq}}\right)$, where $k_B$ is the Boltzmann constant, $c_0$ is the solute concentration and $c_{eq}$ is the equilibrium concentration. For a stoichiometric compound and considering $\mu = \frac{\partial G}{\partial N}$ and $N = \frac{V}{v_a}$, where $v_a$ is the atomic volume:

The line in blue represents the dependence in the case of a liquid and in green the case of a solid. It can be noted that when the concentration of the solute increases, the ΔG_{v} increases, reducing the ΔG_{c} and the critical radius, thus increasing the stability of the system.

$\Delta g_v =\frac{\Delta \mu}{v_a} = - \frac{k_B T}{v_a} ln \left(\frac{c_0}{c_{eq}}\right).$

Defining the supersaturation as $S=\frac{c_0-c_{eq}}{c_{eq}},$ this can be rewritten as

$\Delta g_v = - \frac{k_B T}{v_a} ln \left(1+S\right).$

Finally, the critical radius $r_c$ and the Gibbs free energy of nuclear formation $\Delta G_c$ can be obtained as

$r_c = \frac{2\gamma v_a}{k_B T ln \left(1+S\right)}$,

$\Delta G_c = \frac{16 \pi \gamma^3 V_M^2}{3 (RT ln \left(1+S\right))^2},$

where $V_M$ is the molar volume and $R$ is the molar gas constant.

== See also ==
- Nucleation
- Ostwald ripening
- Supercooling
- Superheating
