= Pseudoproline =

Amino acid

Serine (Oxa), Threonine [Oxa(5-Me)], and Cysteine (THz) Derived Pseudoprolines.

Pseudoproline (also pseudo-proline, ψ-Pro) derivatives are artificially created dipeptides to minimize aggregation during Fmoc solid-phase synthesis of peptides.

== History ==
The chemical synthesis of large peptides is still limited by problems of low solvation during solid phase peptide synthesis (SPPS) or limited solubility of fully protected peptide fragments: even chemoselective ligation methods are hampered by self-association of unprotected peptide blocks. The elucidation of the relationship between preferred conformation of a growing peptide chain and its physicochemical properties reveals that β-sheet (beta-sheet) formation is often paralleled by significant decrease in solvation and solubility. Besides attempts to increase the solvation of peptides by external factors, few attempts, i.e. N-substituted Hmb amino acid derivatives and pseudoprolines (see figure on the top right) have been reported to modify the intrinsic properties of peptides responsible for aggregation and secondary structure formation. Pseudoprolines consist of serine- (Oxa) or threonine-derived oxazolidines [Oxa(5-Me)] and Cysteine-derived thiazolidines (THz) with Proline-like ring structure (see top right). Mutter and coworkers have defined oxa- and thiaproline derivatives of serine, threonine, and cysteine with Ser(ψPro). Thr(ψPro), and Cys(ψPro), respectively, where the abbreviation ψPro indicates the relationship to proline (with heteroatomic ring substitution in position 4). Pseudoprolines with substitution in position 2 of the proline ring are named Ser/Thr/Cys-(ψR1, R2 Pro). Due to the preference for a cis-amide bond with the preceding residue of C2-substituted pseudoprolines, their incorporation results in a kink conformation of the peptide backbone, thus preventing peptide aggregation, self-association, or β-structure formation.

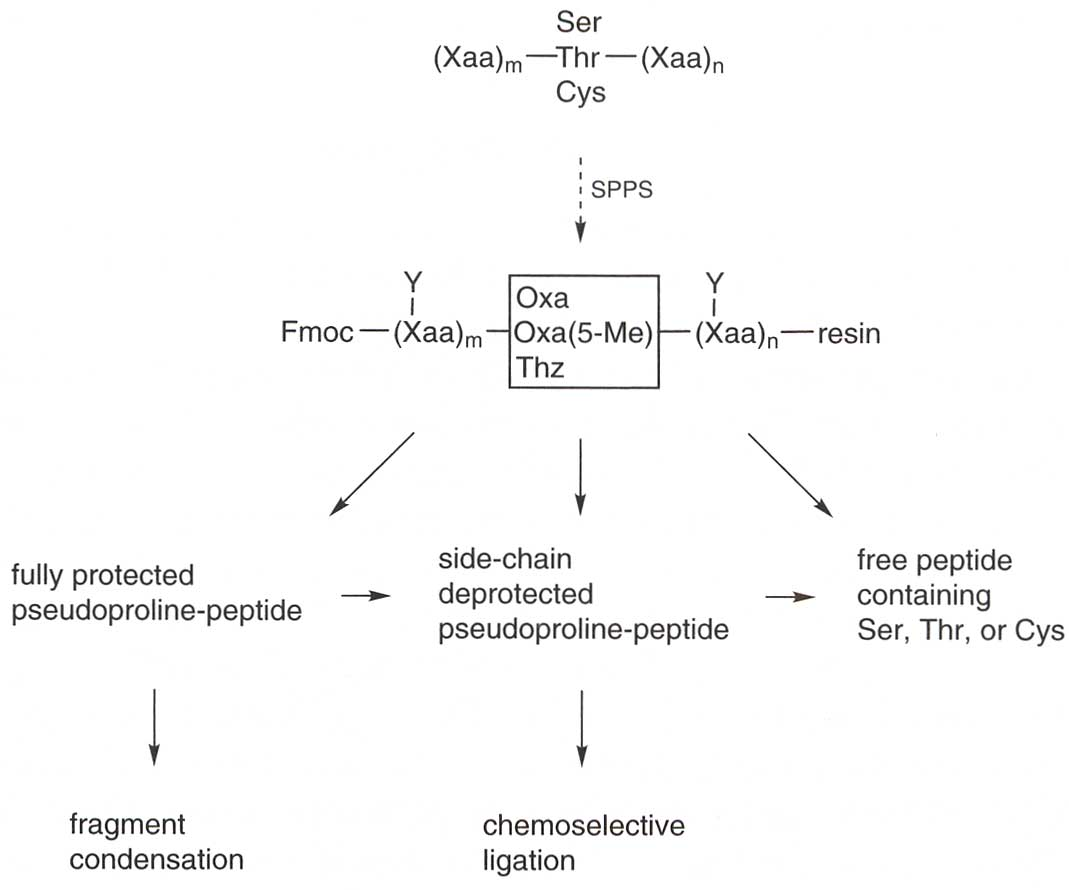
Strategies for the use of Pseudoproline in Solid-Phase Peptide Synthesis (SPPS).

Hence, pseudoprolines fulfill two functions simultaneously: they serve (1) as temporary side-chain protection for Ser, Thr, and Cys and (2) as solubilizing building blocks to increase solvation and coupling rates during peptide synthesis and in subsequent chain assembly. Pseudoprolines are obtained by reacting the free amino acids with aldehydes or ketone. The coupling of amino acid derivatives to a growing peptide chain containing N-terminal pseudoproline generally results in low yields because of the sterically hindered nature of the oxazolidine (thiazolidine) ring system and the decreased nucleophilicity of the nitrogen atom. Consequently, the preformation of suitably protected dipeptide derivatives of the type FMOC-Xaa1-Oxa/THz-OH is preferable for use in peptide synthesis. Two conceptually different approaches are feasible for preparing oxazolidine- and thiazolidine-ring-containing dipeptide derivatives: (1) the in situ acylation of Ser- or Thr-derived oxazolidines or Cys-derived thiazolidines using acid fluorides or N-carboxyanhydrides (NCA); and (2) the direct insertion of the oxazolidine systems into dipeptides (post-insertion) containing C-terminal Ser or Thr. The method of choice strongly depends on the nature of the pseudoproline as welI as on the substituents at C2 of the cyclic system.

== Advantages ==
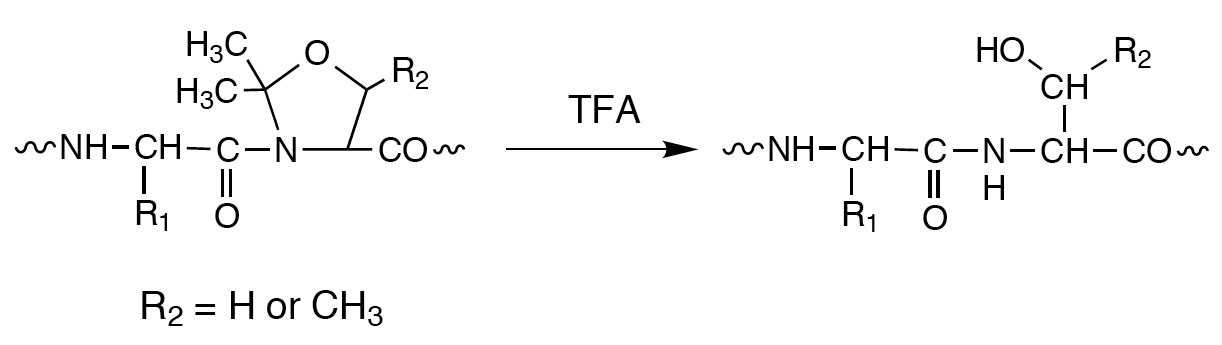
Conversion of pseudo-Pro (ψPro) residues.

Pseudoprolines are a powerful tool for improving the quality of synthetic peptides. Pseudoproline dipeptides have greatly increased the success rate for synthesizing both long and difficult peptides. Pseudoproline dipeptides can be introduced in the same manner as other amino acid derivatives. The routine use of pseudoproline (oxazolidine) dipeptides in the FMOC solid phase peptide synthesis (SPPS) of serine- and threonine-containing peptides leads to remarkable improvements in quality and yield of crude products and helps avoid unnecessary repeat synthesis of failed sequences. Pseudoproline dipeptides have proven particularly effective in the synthesis of intractable peptides, long peptides/small proteins, and cyclic peptides, enabling in many cases the production of peptides that otherwise could not be made. These dipeptides are extremely easy to use: simply substitute a serine or threonine residue together with the preceding amino acid residue in the peptide sequence with the appropriate pseudoproline dipeptide (see the figure on your right). The native sequence is regenerated on cleavage and deprotection.

== Improvements ==
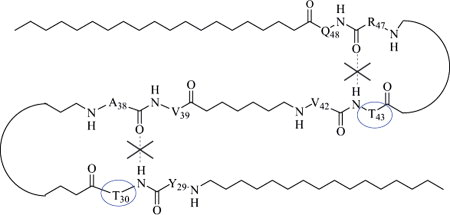
Scheme of part of the beta-sheet of the RANTES structure. Circled amino acids were incorporated as pseudo-Proline dipeptides.

Traditionally, solid-phase synthesis has relied on polystyrene-based resins for the synthesis of all kinds of peptides. However, due to their high hydrophobicity, these resins have certain limitations, particularly in the synthesis of complex peptides, and in such cases, polyethylene glycol (PEG)-based resins are often found to give superior results. Another powerful strategy for expediting the assembly of complex peptides is to employ pseudoproline dipeptides. These derivatives disrupt the interactions among chains that are usually the cause of poor coupling yields in aggregated sequences. A large arsenal of chemical tools is now available for the synthesis of almost all peptides up to 40 amino acid residues. However, several small-size peptides and many large peptides and/or proteins are still unavailable by classical methods.

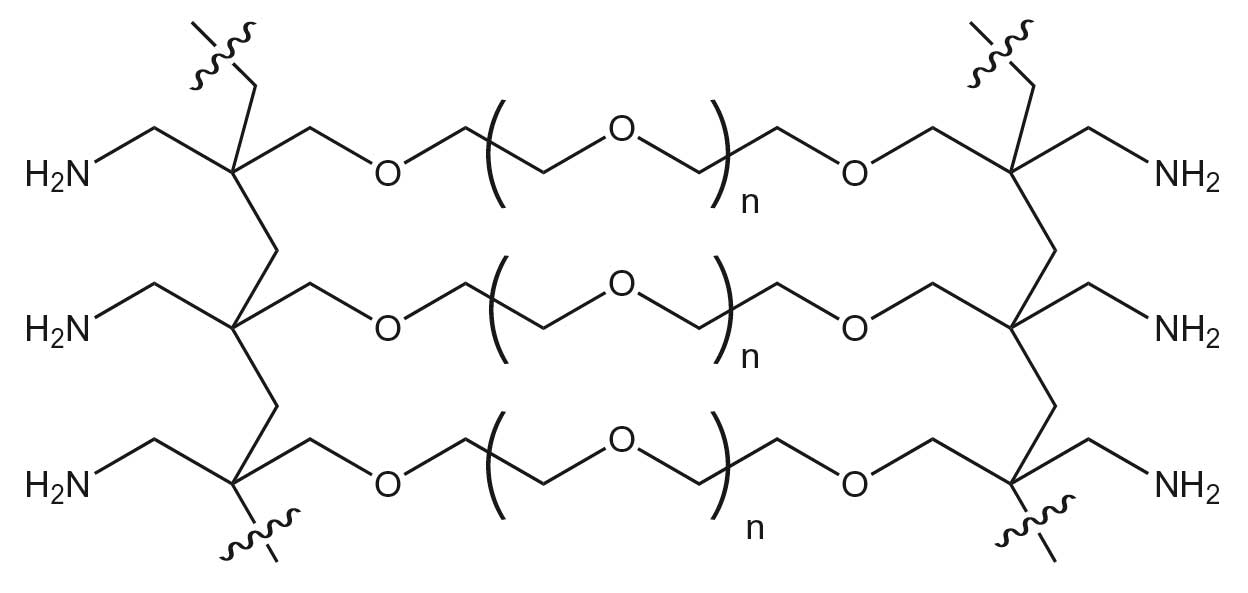
Composition of a polyethylene glycol (PEG)-based resin.

Recently, an efficient stepwise solid-phase synthesis of RANTES (24-91) was published. RANTES is a major HIV-suppressive factor produced by CD8+ T Cells. The serine protease CD26/dipeptidyl-peptidase IV (CD26/DPP IV) induces a NH2-terminal truncation from RANTES (1-91) to RANTES(24-91), which inhibits the infection of monocytes by an M-tropic HIV-1 strain The 68 amino acid of RANTES(24-91) has a high propensity to aggregate. The method combines the advantages of the PEG-based ChemMatrix resin and pseudoproline dipeptides.

Direct coupling to pseudoproline monomer.

Senko and his colleagues were the first to confirm the effectiveness of pseudoproline derivatives of individual, single residues in polypeptide synthesis. According to literature, the conversion of Ser(ΨPro) was excellent, however the Thr(ΨPro) varied in a wide range. The acylation of Pseudoproline monomer depended also on the chemical nature of the acylating residue. Manne and his colleagues successfully synthesized a human Growth Hormone (hGH)-derived polypeptide that was previously challenging to access, using Ser(ΨPro), while JR10 utilized Thr(ΨPro). Building upon Senko et al.'s work, Szaniszló and co-workers have recently improved the acylating efficiency of Thr(ΨPro) and incorporated it into their continuous flow peptide synthesizer.

== See also ==
- Proline
- Peptidomimetics (such as peptoids and β-peptides) are molecules related to peptides, but with different properties.
- Peptide synthesis
- Translation
- Ribosome
