= Stapled peptide =

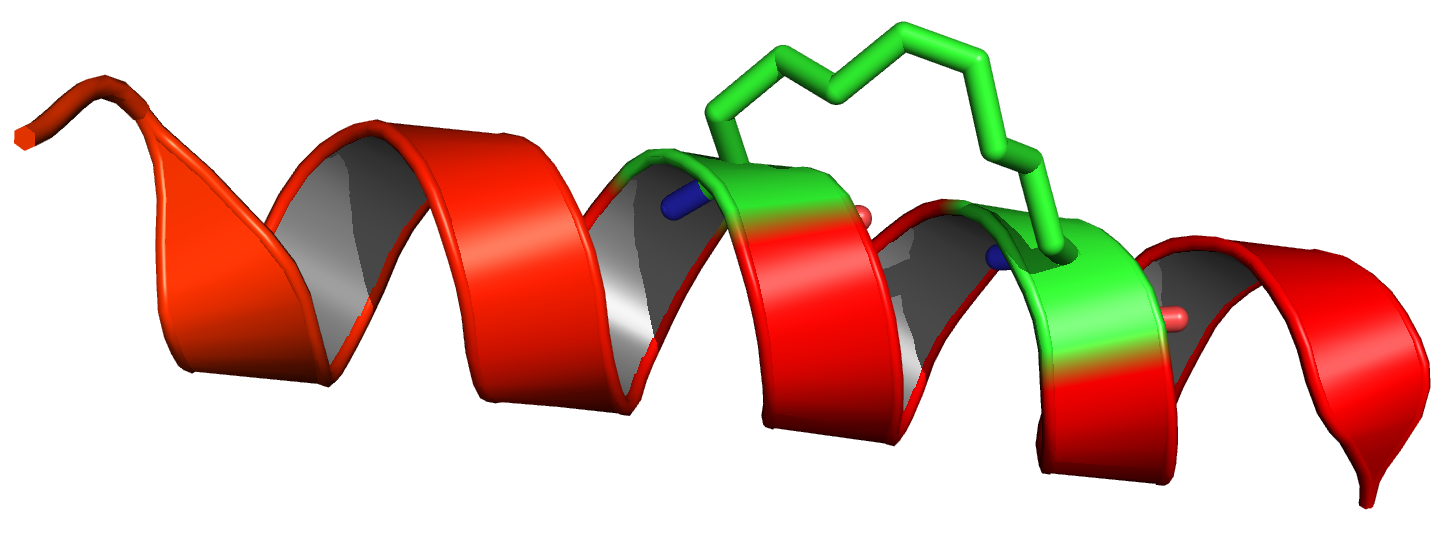
A cartoon depiction of a stapled peptide. The red coloring depicts a helix, and the green coloring denotes the hydrocarbon staple. Rendering based on PDB 4MZK.

A stapled peptide is a modified peptide (class A peptidomimetic), typically in an alpha-helical conformation, that is constrained by a synthetic brace ("staple"). The staple is formed by a covalent linkage between two amino acid side-chains, forming a peptide macrocycle. Staples, generally speaking, refer to a covalent linkage of two previously independent entities, although the term was originally used to describe a non-covalent interaction between two hydrophobic amino acids in protein alpha-helices. Peptides with multiple, tandem staples are sometimes referred to as stitched peptides. Among other applications, peptide stapling is notably used to enhance the pharmacologic performance of peptides.

== Introduction ==
The two primary classes of therapeutics are small molecules and protein therapeutics. The design of small molecule inhibitors of protein-protein interactions (PPIs) has been impeded by issues such as the general lack of small-molecule starting points for drug design, the typical flatness of the interface, the difficulty of distinguishing real from artifactual binding, and the size and character of typical small-molecule libraries. Meanwhile, the protein therapeutics that lack these issues are bedeviled by another problem, poor cell penetration due to an insufficient ability to diffuse across the cell membrane. Additionally, proteins and peptides are often subject to proteolytic degradation in vivo or if they do enter the cell. Furthermore, small peptides (such as single alpha-helices or α-helices) can lose helicity in solution due to entropic factors, which diminishes binding affinity.

α-Helices are the most common protein secondary structure and play a key role in mediating many PPIs by serving as recognition motifs. PPIs are frequently misregulated in disease, providing the long-running impetus to create alpha-helical peptides to inhibit disease-state PPIs for clinical applications, as well as for basic science applications. Introducing a synthetic brace (staple) helps to lock a peptide in a specific conformation, reducing conformational entropy. This approach can increase target affinity, increase cell penetration, and protect against proteolytic degradation. Various strategies have been employed for constraining α-helices, including the non-covalent and covalent stabilization techniques; however, the all-hydrocarbon covalent link, termed a peptide staple, has been shown to have improved stability and cell penetrability, making this stabilization strategy particularly relevant for clinical applications.

== Examples ==
=== Metathesis-stapled peptides ===
Olefin terminated, non-natural amino acids used as building blocks to form stapled peptides. R isomers shown, but S enantiomers may also be used.

Staples synthesized using ring-closing metathesis (RCM) are common and were among the first to be invented. This variation of olefin metathesis and its application to stapled peptides was developed by Nobel laureate Robert H. Grubbs and Helen Blackwell in the late 1990s, who used the Grubbs catalyst to cross-link O-allylserine residues in a covalent bond. In 2000, Gregory Verdine and colleagues reported the first synthesis of an all-hydrocarbon cross-link for peptide α-helix stabilization, combining the principles of RCM with α,α-disubstitution of the amino acid chiral carbon and on-resin peptide synthesis. In collaboration with Edward Taylor of Princeton University, Loren Walensky, who was then a post-doc in Verdine's lab, subsequently demonstrated that stapling BH3 peptides enabled the synthetic peptides to retain their α-helical conformation, further demonstrating that these peptides were taken up by cancer cells and bound their physiologic BCL-2 family targets, which correlated with the induction of cell death. It was discovered that the peptides side-stepped the membrane diffusion issue by crossing the membrane through active endosomal uptake, which deposited the peptides inside of the cell. Since this first proof of principle, peptide stapling technology has been applied to numerous peptide templates, allowing the study of many other PPIs using stapled peptides including cancer targets such as p53, MCL-1 BH3, PUMA BH3, Notch, and beta-Catenin, as well as other therapeutic targets ranging from infectious diseases to metabolism.

=== Triazole-stapled peptides ===
The copper(I)-catalyzed azide-alkyne cycloaddition (CuAAC) or "click" reaction, discovered independently by the research groups of Meldal and Sharpless, has been used to introduce 1,2,3-triazole staples in peptides carrying an azide and alkyne moiety on their side chains. The 1,2,3-triazole has been found to be a good bioisostere of naturally occurring disulfide bridges (between two cysteines).

=== Aryl halide-stapled peptides ===
Sufficiently electrophilic aryl halides have been used as staples as they can bridge two amino acids with nucleophilic side chains, most notably two cysteines. These include fluorobenzenes and dichlorotetrazine. The diversity of aryl halides in terms of electrophilicity and regiochemistry offers a way of tuning the reactivity and tightness of the staple. The latter aspect has been applied to the tuning of secondary structure of small peptides.

== Clinical applications ==
In 2013, Aileron Therapeutics, which was co-founded by Verdine, Walensky and Taylor, completed the first stapled peptide clinical trial with their growth-hormone-releasing hormone agonist ALRN-5281. As of 2019, Aileron Therapeutics is developing another candidate, sulanemadlin (ALRN-6924), in a Phase 2a trial that assesses the combination of sulanemadlin and Pfizer's palbociclib for the treatment of patients with MDM2-amplified cancers, and a Phase 1b/2 clinical trial to evaluate sulanemadlin as a myelopreservative agent to protect against chemotherapy-induced toxicities.

== See also ==
- Beta-peptide
- Druggability
- Non-proteinogenic amino acids
- Peptide synthesis
- Peptidomimetic
- Peptoid
