= Verdine =

Verdine may refer to:

- Gregory L. Verdine, American biologist
- Verdine White, American musician
