= Foldamer =

Chain molecule which folds in predictable ways while in solution

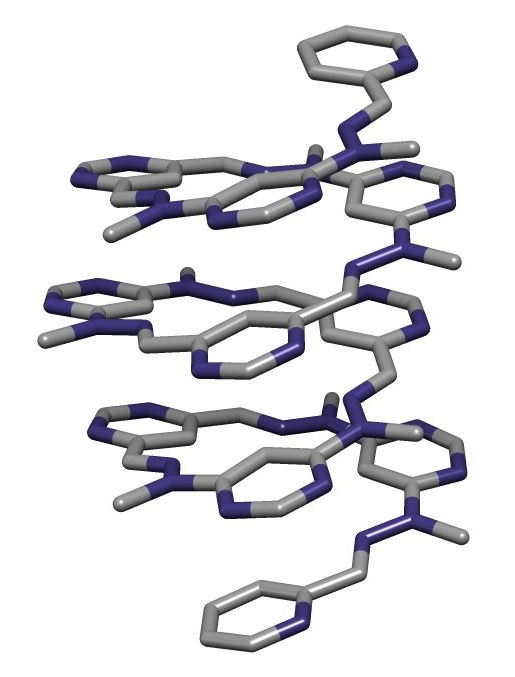
Crystal structure of a foldamer reported in.

Dynamic view of an alpha-beta foldamer

In chemistry, a foldamer is a discrete chain molecule (oligomer) that folds into a conformationally ordered state in solution. They are artificial molecules that mimic the ability of proteins, nucleic acids, and polysaccharides to fold into well-defined conformations, such as α-helices and β-sheets. The structure of a foldamer is stabilized by noncovalent interactions between nonadjacent monomers. Foldamers are studied with the main goal of designing large molecules with predictable structures. The study of foldamers is related to the themes of molecular self-assembly, molecular recognition, and host–guest chemistry.

== Design ==
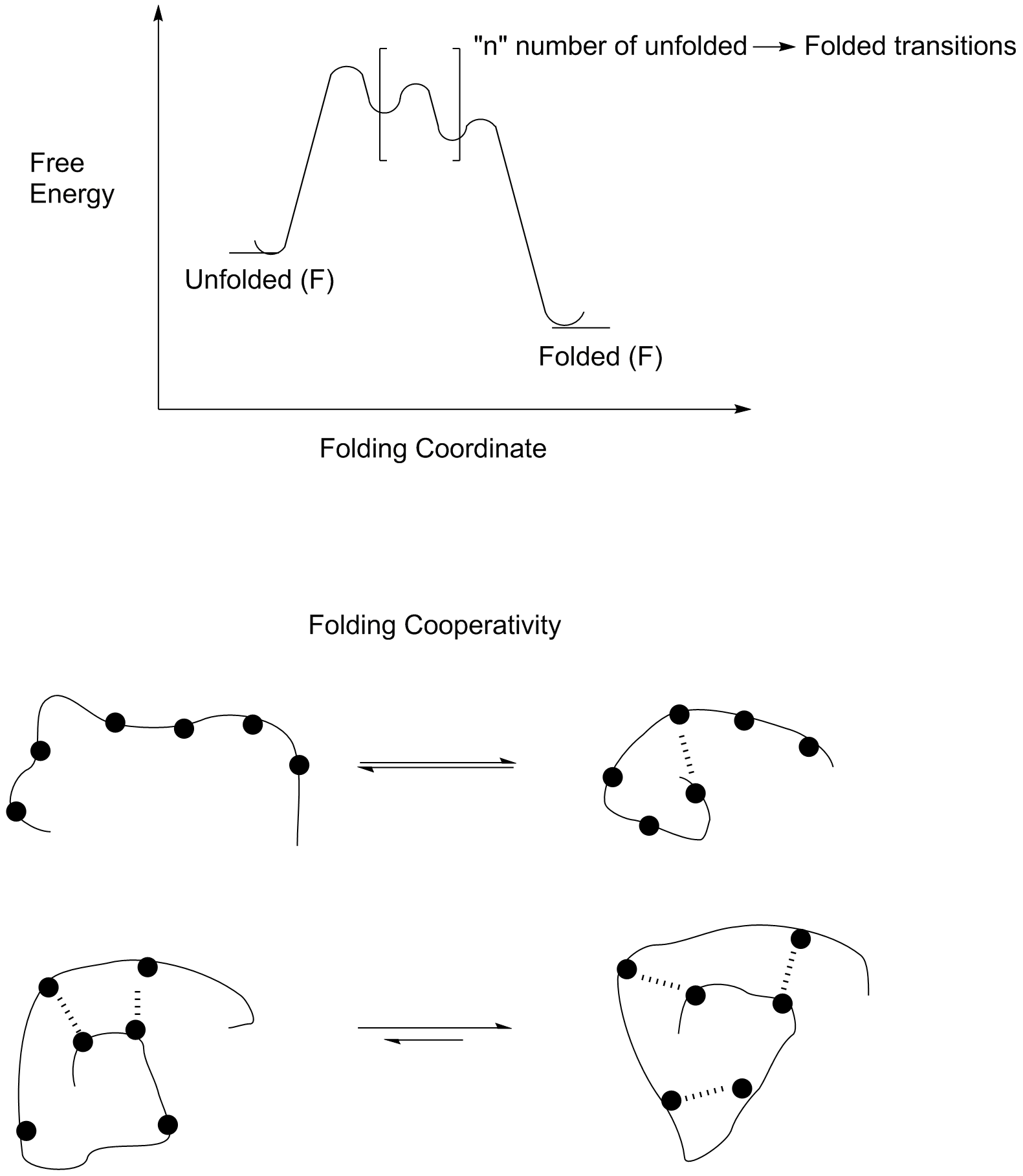
Free energy diagram of the folding of a foldamer.

Foldamers can vary in size, but they are defined by the presence of noncovalent, nonadjacent interactions. This definition excludes molecules like poly(isocyanates) (commonly known as polyurethane) and poly(prolines) as they fold into helices reliably due to adjacent covalent interactions. Foldamers have a dynamic folding reaction (unfolded → folded), in which large macroscopic folding is caused by solvophobic effects (hydrophobic collapse), while the final energy state of the folded foldamer is due to the noncovalent interactions. These interactions work cooperatively to form the most stable tertiary structure, as the completely folded and unfolded states are more stable than any partially folded state.

=== Prediction of folding ===
The structure of a foldamer can often be predicted from its primary sequence. This process involves dynamic simulations of the folding equilibria at the atomic level under various conditions. This type of analysis may be applied to small proteins as well; however, as of 2024, computational technology is unable to simulate all but the shortest of sequences.

The folding pathway of a foldamer can be determined by measuring the variation from the experimentally-determined favored structure under different thermodynamic and kinetic conditions. The change in structure is measured by calculating the root mean square deviation from the backbone atomic position of the favored structure. The structure of the foldamer under different conditions can be determined computationally and then verified experimentally. Changes in the temperature, solvent viscosity, pressure, pH, and salt concentration can all yield valuable information about the structure of the foldamer. Measuring the kinetics of folding as well as folding equilibria allow one to observe the effects of these different conditions on the foldamer structure.

Solvents often influence folding. For example, a folding pathway involving hydrophobic collapse would fold differently in a nonpolar solvent. This difference is due to the fact that different solvents stabilize different intermediates of the folding pathway as well as different final foldamer structures based on intermolecular noncovalent interactions.

=== Noncovalent interactions ===
Noncovalent intermolecular interactions, albeit individually small, collectively alter chemical reactions in major ways. Listed below are common intermolecular forces that chemists have used to design foldamers.

- Hydrogen bonding (especially with peptide bonds)
- Pi stacking
- Solvophobic effects, which lead to hydrophobic collapse
- Van der Waals forces
- Electrostatic attraction

== Common designs ==
Foldamers are classified into three different categories: peptidomimetic foldamers, nucleotidomimetic foldamers, and abiotic foldamers. Peptidomimetic foldamers are synthetic molecules that mimic the structure of proteins, while nucleotidomimetic foldamers are based on the interactions in nucleic acids. Abiotic foldamers are stabilized by aromatic and charge-transfer interactions which are not generally found in nature. The three designs described below deviate from Moore's strict definition of a foldamer, which excludes helical foldamers.

=== Peptidomimetic ===
Peptidomimetic foldamers often break the previously mentioned definition of foldamers as they often adopt helical structures. They represent a major landmark of foldamer research due to their design and capabilities. The largest groups of peptidomimetic consist of β-peptides, γ-peptides and δ-peptides, and the possible monomeric combinations. The amino acids of these peptides only differ by one (β), two (γ), or three (δ) methylene carbons, yet the structural changes were profound. These peptide sequences are highly studied as sequence control leads to reliable folding prediction. Additionally, with multiple methylene carbons between the carboxyl and amino termini of the flanking peptide bonds, varying R-group side chains can be designed. One example of the novelty of β-peptides can be seen in the findings of Reiser and coworkers. Using a heteroligopeptide consisting of α-amino acids and cis-β-aminocyclopropanecarboxulic acids (cis-β-ACCs), they found the formation of helical sequences in oligomers as short as seven residues and defined conformation in five residues, a quality unique to peptides containing cyclic β-amino acids.

=== Nucleotidomimetic ===
Nucleotidomimetics do not generally qualify as foldamers. Most are designed to mimic single DNA bases, nucleosides, or nucleotides in order to nonspecifically target DNA. These have several different medicinal uses including anti-cancer, anti-viral, and anti-fungal applications.

=== Abiotic ===
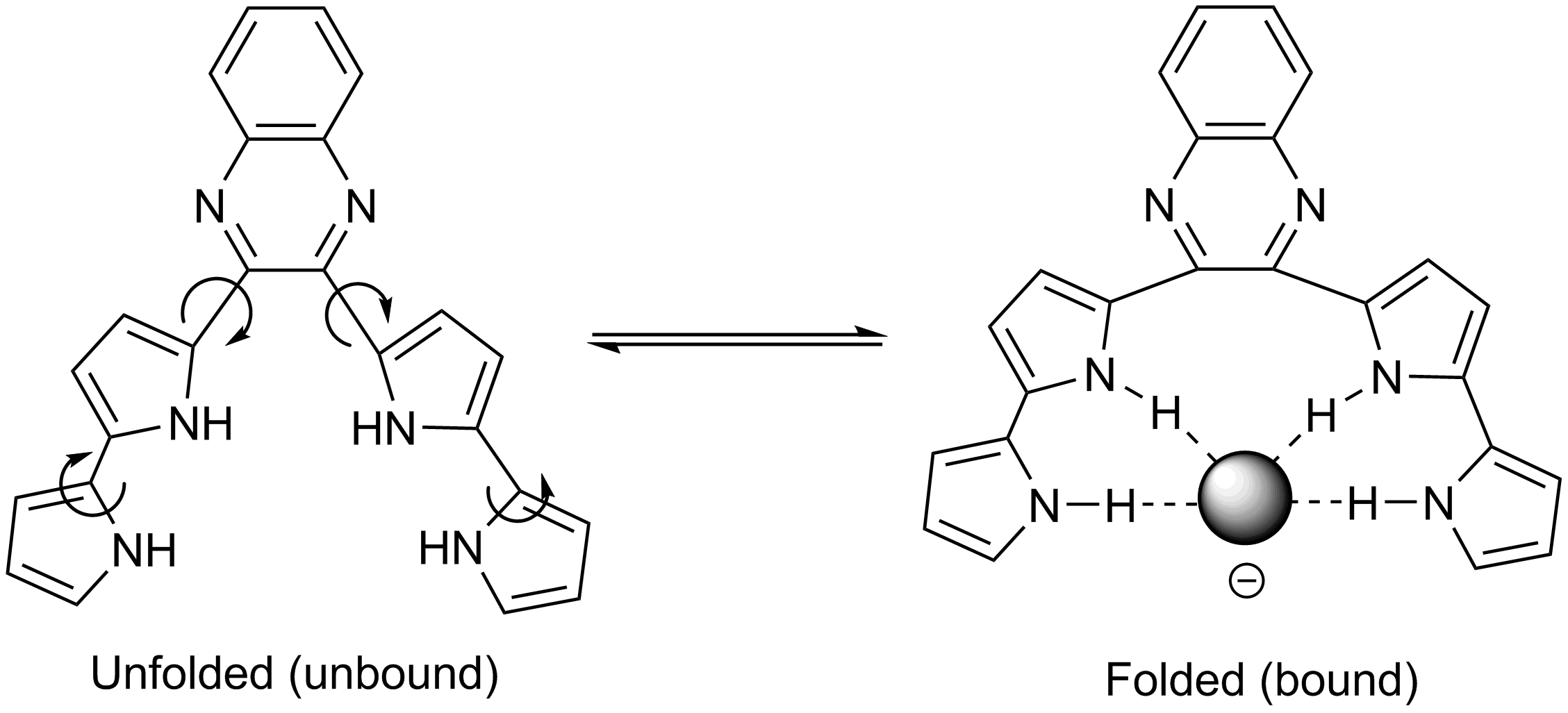
Folding and Coordination of an Oligopyrrole

Abiotic foldamers are again organic molecules designed to exhibit dynamic folding. They exploit a few known key intermolecular interactions, as optimized by their design. One example is oligopyrroles that organize upon binding anions like chloride through hydrogen bonding (see figure). Folding is induced in the presence of an anion: the polypyrrole groups have little conformational restriction otherwise.

=== Other examples ===
- m-Phenylene ethynylene oligomers are driven to fold into a helical conformation by solvophobic forces and aromatic stacking interactions.
- β-peptides are composed of amino acids containing an additional CH_{2} unit between the amine and carboxylic acid. They are more stable to enzymatic degradation and have been demonstrated to have antimicrobial activity.
- Peptoids are N-substituted polyglycines that utilize steric interactions to fold into polyproline type-I-like helical structures.
- Aedamers that fold in aqueous solutions driven by hydrophobic and aromatic stacking interactions.
- Aromatic oligoamide foldamers. These examples are some of the largest and best structurally characterized foldamers.
- Arylamide foldamers, such as brilacidin.
