= Proteomimetic =

Molecules that mimic protein characteristics

Proteomimetics are molecules that mimic certain protein characteristics such as shape, binding properties or enzymatic activity. While conceptually linked to peptidomimetics which mimic short peptide sequences or secondary structures, proteomimetics recapitulate tertiary structures. This can involve the mimicry of entire protein domains or fragments thereof. Proteomimetic approaches can range from entirely abiotic scaffolds to specific main chain and side chain-modifications.
