= Atilotrelvir =

Clinical data
- Other names: GST-HG171

Identifiers
- IUPAC name: (1S,3S,4R)-N-[(1S)-1-cyano-2-[(3S)-2-oxopyrrolidin-3-yl]ethyl]-2-[(2S)-3,3-dimethyl-2-[(2,2,2-trifluoroacetyl)amino]butanoyl]spiro[2-azabicyclo[2.2.1]heptane-5,1'-cyclopropane]-3-carboxamide
- CAS Number: 2850365-55-6
- PubChem CID: 167518234
- DrugBank: DB19439
- ChemSpider: 129309388
- UNII: JVV7PSN6VL

Chemical and physical data
- Formula: C_{24}H_{32}F_{3}N_{5}O_{4}
- Molar mass: 511.546 g·mol^{−1}
- 3D model (JSmol): Interactive image
- SMILES: CC(C)(C)[C@@H](C(=O)N1[C@H]2C[C@@H]([C@H]1C(=O)N[C@@H](C[C@@H]3CCNC3=O)C#N)C4(C2)CC4)NC(=O)C(F)(F)F
- InChI: InChI=InChI=1S/C24H32F3N5O4/c1-22(2,3)17(31-21(36)24(25,26)27)20(35)32-14-9-15(23(10-14)5-6-23)16(32)19(34)30-13(11-28)8-12-4-7-29-18(12)33/h12-17H,4-10H2,1-3H3,(H,29,33)(H,30,34)(H,31,36)/t12-,13-,14-,15-,16-,17+/m0/s1; Key:GTRJFXDJASEGSW-KBCNZALWSA-N

Atilotrelvir (development code GST-HG171) is a drug for the treatment of COVID-19. It has broad-spectrum anti-SARS-CoV-2 activity against different variants (including WT, β, δ, and omicron).

In combination with ritonavir, it was approved for use in China in 2023.
