= C7H15NO2 =

The molecular formula C_{7}H_{15}NO_{2} (molar mass: 145.20 g/mol, exact mass: 145.1103 u) may refer to:

- Emylcamate
- β-Homoleucine, also known as 3-amino-5-methylhexanoic acid
