= Gregory L. Verdine =

American chemical biologist

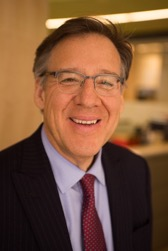
- Born: Gregory L. Verdine; June 10, 1959 (age 67); Somers Point, New Jersey, U.S.
- Education: Saint Joseph's University (BS); Columbia University (PhD)
- Known for: Stapled peptides
- Awards: Searle Scholar Award (1990)
- Scientific career
- Fields: Chemical biology
- Workplaces: Harvard University; Fog Pharmaceuticals
- Thesis: Binding of mitomycin C to a dinucleoside phosphate and DNA (1986)
- Doctoral advisor: Koji Nakanishi and Maria Tomasz
- Notable students: Orlando D. Schärer

Gregory L. Verdine (born June 10, 1959) is an American chemical biologist, biotech entrepreneur, venture capitalist and university professor. He is a founder of the field of chemical biology, which deals with the application of chemical techniques to biological systems. His work has focused on mechanisms of DNA repair and cell penetrability.

Verdine is the co-inventor with Christian Schafmeister of stapled peptides, a new class of drugs that combines the versatile binding properties of monoclonal antibodies with the cell-penetrating ability of small molecules. Verdine coined the term "drugging the undruggable" to describe the unique capabilities of stapled peptides. A close analog of a stapled peptide drug invented in the Verdine Lab, sulanemadlin (ALRN-6924), is a first-in-class dual MDM2/MDMX inhibitor currently in Phase II clinical development by Aileron Therapeutics, which he co-founded in 2005. FogPharma, founded in 2016, aims to further develop stapled peptide technology for therapeutic use.

He has founded numerous other drug discovery companies, including six that are listed on the NASDAQ. His companies have succeeded in developing two FDA-approved drugs, romidepsin and paritaprevir, which are, respectively, an anticancer agent used in cutaneous T-cell lymphoma (CTCL) and other peripheral T-cell lymphomas (PTCLs), and an acylsulfonamide inhibitor that is used to treat chronic hepatitis C.

== Education and training ==
Verdine received a Bachelor of Science in chemistry from Saint Joseph's University and a PhD in chemistry from Columbia University, working under Koji Nakanishi and Maria Tomasz. He held an NIH postdoctoral fellowship in molecular biology at MIT and Harvard Medical School, and joined the faculty of Harvard University in 1988.

== Academic career ==
Over the course of his academic career at Harvard University and the Harvard Medical School, Verdine has elucidated the molecular mechanism of epigenetic DNA methylation and pathways by which certain genotoxic forms of DNA damage are surveilled in and eradicated from the genome. As a professor, Verdine introduced biological principles into organic chemistry courses and helped found two fields of science that meld basic research and new medicines discovery: chemical biology, which enlists chemistry to answer biological questions; and new modalities, which works to discover and develop novel structural classes of therapeutics.

He has served as the Erving Professor of Chemistry in the Departments of Stem Cell and Regenerative Biology and Chemistry and Chemical Biology at Harvard University since 1988. In 2013, he stepped down from his tenured professorship at Harvard, taking a leave of absence in order to focus full-time on steering Warp Drive Bio as CEO while continuing to run his eponymous Verdine Laboratory at the Harvard University Department of Stem Cell & Regenerative Biology. The laboratory focused on research based in chemical biology, including synthetic biologics and genomic research,. He has since transitioned to a 'professor of the practice' position at Harvard.

== Research ==
In his academic research, Verdine made fundamental discoveries about how organisms manage their genomes: how they tag specific cell types and conduct search-and-destroy operations for cancer-causing abnormalities. Verdine has published more than 190 academic articles. In 2005, Verdine and Anirban Banerjee published research in crystallography showing how enzymes could be used to fix flawed DNA. In 2013, Verdine received a research grant to study cell-penetrating miniproteins in order to target cancer cells. His work has led to the FDA approval of the drugs romidepsin and paritaprevir.

Verdine is also the inventor of stapled peptide technology, which stabilizes peptides intended for therapeutic use by introducing an all-hydrocarbon “staple” into the peptide’s linear backbone. These “stapled” peptides have a higher affinity for their targets, enter cells more easily and are less readily degraded.

== Biotechnology ==
=== Companies ===
To translate his discoveries into therapeutics, Verdine has founded or co-founded numerous public biotech companies including Variagenics, Enanta, Eleven Bio, Tokai, Wave Life Sciences, and Aileron. He also founded the private company Gloucester Pharmaceuticals, which was acquired by Celgene in 2009. His companies share the mission of developing molecules intended to target “hard-to-drug” endogenous targets that have remained out of reach of modern cell-penetration technologies.

==== FogPharma ====
In 2016, Verdine co-founded FogPharma with Sir David Lane to develop next-generation stapled peptides, Cell-Penetrating Miniproteins (CPMPs), a broad new class of medicines that aim to combine the cell-penetrating abilities of small molecules with the strong target engagement of biologics. In 2024, FogPharma was rebranded to Parabilis Medicines.

==== LifeMine ====
Founded alongside FogPharma in 2016, LifeMine seeks to discover, characterize, and translate into medicine bioactive compounds in fungal genomes.

==== Gloucester Marine Genomics Institute ====
Founded in 2013, the nonprofit Gloucester Marine Genomics Institute to study marine genomes for potential therapeutic compounds and to advance fisheries science. He is also the founder and director of the Gloucester Biotechnology Academy, which is providing technical training in the life science industry to high school graduates in Gloucester, MA, USA.

==== Warp Drive Bio ====
In 2012, Verdine founded Warp Drive Bio with cofounders George Church and James Wells. The company maps the genomes of soil-dwelling microbes in the search for potential treatments for drug-resistant ailments. In 2013, Verdine became full-time CEO of Warp Drive Bio, then handed the CEO position to Lawrence Reid in 2016 in order to found two new startups, FogPharma and LifeMine.

==== Wave Life Sciences ====
Verdine is the Chairman of the Board of Wave Life Sciences, which uses synthetic chemistry to develop nucleic acid therapeutic candidates.

=== Venture capital ===
Verdine has worked in the venture capital industry as a Venture Partner with Apple Tree Partners, Third Rock Ventures, and WuXi Healthcare Ventures, and as a Special Advisor to Texas Pacific Group.

=== Scientific consultation ===
Verdine is a member of both the Board of Scientific Consultants of the Memorial Sloan-Kettering Cancer Center, the Board of Scientific Advisors of the National Cancer Institute, Advisory Board at Spinal Muscular Atrophy Foundation, and the Board of Reviewers at Bill & Melinda Gates Foundation.

== Recent recognition ==
2019 - Honorary Doctor of Science Degree, Clarkson University

2019 - Herman S. Bloch Award for Scientific Excellence in Industry, University of Chicago

2011 - American Association for Cancer Research Award for Excellence in Chemistry in Cancer Research

2007 - Nobel Laureate Signature Award for Graduate Education in Chemistry, with Anirban Banerjee

2005 - Royal Society of Chemistry Nucleic Acid Award Lecture, Responses to DNA Damage conference
