= Space compression =

Space compression may refer to:

- data compression
- space folding (disambiguation)
- time-space compression
