= Ombitasvir =

Chemical compound

Clinical data
- Trade names: Viekira Pak, Viekira XR (with ombitasvir, paritaprevir, ritonavir and dasabuvir), Technivie (with ombitasvir, paritaprevir, and ritonavir)
- Other names: ABT-267
- License data: EU EMA: by INN
- Routes of administration: By mouth (tablets)

Legal status
- Legal status: US: ℞-only

Pharmacokinetic data
- Bioavailability: Not determined
- Protein binding: ~99.9%
- Metabolism: Amide hydrolysis followed by oxidation
- Onset of action: ~4 to 5 hours
- Elimination half-life: 21 to 25 hours
- Excretion: Mostly with feces (90.2%)

Identifiers
- IUPAC name: Dimethyl N,N′-{[(2S,5S)-1-(4-tert-butylphenyl)pyrrolidene-2,5-diyl]-bis-{[(4,1-phenyleneazanediyl)carbonyl] [(2S)-pyrrolidine-2,1-diyl]}[(2S)-3-methyl-1-oxobutane-1,2-diyl])}biscarbamate
- CAS Number: 1258226-87-7
- PubChem CID: 54767916
- ChemSpider: 31136214
- UNII: 2302768XJ8
- KEGG: D10576
- ChEBI: CHEBI:85183
- CompTox Dashboard (EPA): DTXSID201027920

Chemical and physical data
- Formula: C_{50}H_{67}N_{7}O_{8}
- Molar mass: 894.127 g·mol^{−1}
- 3D model (JSmol): Interactive image
- SMILES: CC(C)[C@@H](C(=O)N1CCC[C@H]1C(=O)Nc2ccc(cc2)[C@@H]3CC[C@H](N3c4ccc(cc4)C(C)(C)C)c5ccc(cc5)NC(=O)[C@@H]6CCCN6C(=O)[C@H](C(C)C)NC(=O)OC)NC(=O)OC
- InChI: InChI=1S/C50H67N7O8/c1-30(2)42(53-48(62)64-8)46(60)55-28-10-12-40(55)44(58)51-35-20-14-32(15-21-35)38-26-27-39(57(38)37-24-18-34(19-25-37)50(5,6)7)33-16-22-36(23-17-33)52-45(59)41-13-11-29-56(41)47(61)43(31(3)4)54-49(63)65-9/h14-25,30-31,38-43H,10-13,26-29H2,1-9H3,(H,51,58)(H,52,59)(H,53,62)(H,54,63)/t38-,39-,40-,41-,42-,43-/m0/s1; Key:PIDFDZJZLOTZTM-KHVQSSSXSA-N

Ombitasvir is an antiviral drug for the treatment of hepatitis C virus (HCV) infection by AbbVie. In the United States, it is approved by the Food and Drug Administration for use in combination with paritaprevir, ritonavir and dasabuvir in the product Viekira Pak for the treatment of HCV genotype 1, and with paritaprevir and ritonavir in the product Technivie for the treatment of HCV genotype 4.

Ombitasvir is an NS5A inhibitor that acts by inhibiting the HCV protein NS5A.

== See also ==
- Discovery and development of NS5A inhibitors
