= Β-Homoleucine =

β-Homoleucine
- L-β-homoleucine

Names
- IUPAC name 3-Amino-5-methylhexanoic acid
- Other names H-BETA-HOMOLEU-OH; H-BETA-HOLEU-OH; H-β-homo-Leu-OH

Identifiers
CAS Number	(DL): 3653-34-7; (D): 91298-67-8; (L): 22818-43-5
3D model (JSmol)	(DL): Interactive image; (D): Interactive image; (L): Interactive image
Beilstein Reference	8073252
ChEBI	(DL): CHEBI:181613; (L): CHEBI:177031
ChemSpider	(DL): 2015511; (D): 5308297; (L): 2042253
EC Number	(DL): 676-223-8; (D): 676-223-8; (L): 674-652-5
PubChem CID	(DL): 2733735; (D): 6934243; (L): 2761525
UNII	(L): W6F7K5U7XB
CompTox Dashboard (EPA)	(DL): DTXSID50369992; (D): DTXSID80426163; (L): DTXSID70375813
- InChI: Key: MLYMSIKVLAPCAK-UHFFFAOYSA-N; (DL): InChI=1S/C7H15NO2/c1-5(2)3-6(8)4-7(9)10/h5-6H,3-4,8H2,1-2H3,(H,9,10); (D): InChI=1S/C7H15NO2/c1-5(2)3-6(8)4-7(9)10/h5-6H,3-4,8H2,1-2H3,(H,9,10)/t6-/m1/s1 Key: MLYMSIKVLAPCAK-ZCFIWIBFSA-N; (L): InChI=1S/C7H15NO2/c1-5(2)3-6(8)4-7(9)10/h5-6H,3-4,8H2,1-2H3,(H,9,10)/t6-/m0/s1 Key: MLYMSIKVLAPCAK-LURJTMIESA-N
- SMILES: (DL): CC(C)CC(CC(=O)O)N; (D): CC(C)C[C@H](CC(=O)O)N; (L): CC(C)C[C@@H](CC(=O)O)N

Properties
Chemical formula	C_{7}H_{15}NO_{2}
Molar mass	145.202 g·mol^{−1}

Hazards
- Occupational safety and health (OHS/OSH)
Main hazards	Flammable
- GHS labelling
Pictograms	(GHS07: Exclamation mark)
Signal word	Warning
Hazard statements	H317
Precautionary statements	P261, P272, P280, P302+P352, P321, P333+P313, P363, P501
NFPA 704 (fire diamond)	1 0 0
- Except where otherwise noted, data are given for materials in their standard state (at 25 °C [77 °F], 100 kPa). Infobox references

β-Homoleucine, also known as 3-amino-5-methylhexanoic acid, belongs to a class of unusual amino acids known as β-homo amino acids or beta amino acids. The more common α-analogues of these amino acids are present in greater quantities and make up most polypeptides in a cell. β-Amino acids, however, can also be found in nature and bound to polypeptides, although at a reduced frequency. β-Homoleucine can exists as either of two enantiomers, D-β-homoleucine and L-β-homoleucine, with L-β-homoleucine being the more common isomer. β-Homoleucine hydrochloride is the hydrochloride salt of the amino acid.

== Properties ==
Homolecuine shares many of the same properties as its α-analogue leucine. Some notable differences include being remarkably stable to metabolism, exhibiting slow microbial degradation, and being inherently stable to proteases and peptidases, as well as folding into well-ordered secondary structures consisting of helices, turns, and sheets.
