= Peptoid nanosheet =

Synthetic protein structure made from peptoids

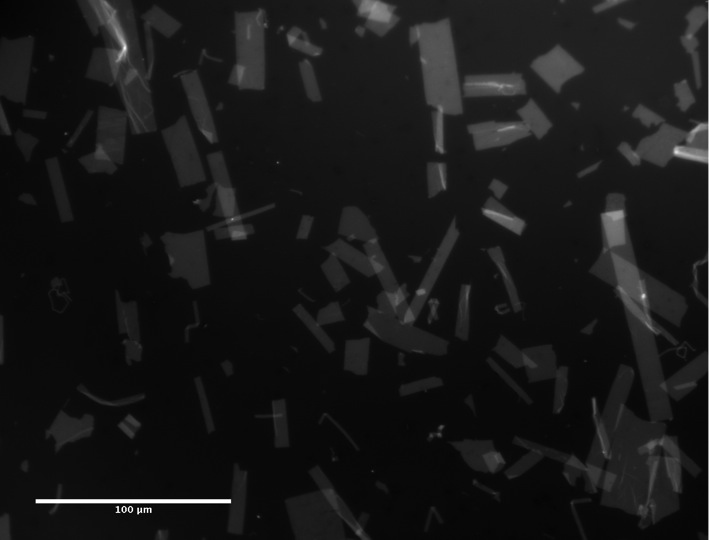
Fluorescent microscopy image of peptoid nanosheets viewed using Nile Red dye.

In nanobiotechnology, a peptoid nanosheet is a synthetic protein structure made from peptoids. Peptoid nanosheets have a thickness of about three nanometers and a length of up to 100 micrometers, meaning that they have a two-dimensional, flat shape that resembles paper on the nanoscale.

== Synthesis ==
For assembly, a purified amphiphilic polypeptoid of specific sequence is dissolved in aqueous solution. These form a monolayer (Langmuir–Blodgett film) on the air-water interface with their hydrophobic side chains oriented in air and hydrophilic side chains in the water. When this mono-layer is shrunk, it buckles into a bilayer with the hydrophobic groups forming the interior core of the peptoid nanosheet. This method has been standardized by repetitively tilting vials of peptoid solution at 85° before returning the vials to the upright position. This repetitive vial "rocking" motion lessens the interfacial area of the air-water interface inside the vial, compressing the peptoid mono-layer by a factor of four and causing the mono-layer to buckle into peptoid nanosheets. Using this method, nanosheets are produced in high yield, and 95% of the peptoid polymer starting material is efficiently converted into peptoid nanosheets after rocking the vials several hundred times.

== Applications ==
Peptoid nanosheets have a very high surface area, which can be readily functionalized to serve as a platform for sensing and templating. Also, their hydrophobic interiors can accommodate hydrophobic small molecule cargos, which have been demonstrated by the sequestration of Nile red when this dye was injected into an aqueous solution of the peptoid nanosheets. For these reasons, the hydrophobic interior of the 2D nanosheets could be an attractive platform for loading or embedding hydrophobic cargo, such as drug molecules, fluorophores, aromatic compounds, and metal nanoparticles.

== See also ==
- Nanosheet
- Langmuir–Blodgett film
- Nanosheets.org Images, videos and interactive molecular models of the peptoid nanosheet.
