= Paritaprevir =

Chemical compound

Clinical data
- Trade names: Viekira Pak (in combination with ombitasvir, ritonavir and dasabuvir), Technivie/Viekirax (in combination with ombitasvir and ritonavir)
- Other names: Veruprevir; ABT-450
- License data: EU EMA: by INN
- Routes of administration: Oral
- ATC code: J05AP52 (WHO) J05AP53 (WHO)

Legal status
- Legal status: US: ℞-only

Pharmacokinetic data
- Bioavailability: was not evaluated
- Protein binding: 97–98.6%
- Metabolism: Hepatic, CYP3A4 and CYP3A5
- Onset of action: 4 to 5 hours
- Elimination half-life: 5.5 hours
- Excretion: feces (88%), urine (8,8%)

Identifiers
- IUPAC name: (2R,6S,12Z,13aS,14aR,16aS)-N-(Cyclopropylsulfonyl)-6-{[(5-methyl-2-pyrazinyl)carbonyl]amino}-5,16-dioxo-2-(6-phenanthridinyloxy)-1,2,3,6,7,8,9,10,11,13a,14,15,16,16a-tetradecahydrocyclopropa[e]pyrrolo [1,2-a] [1,4]diazacyclopentadecine-14a(5H)-carboxamide
- CAS Number: 1216941-48-8
- PubChem CID: 45110509
- DrugBank: DB09297
- ChemSpider: 32700634
- UNII: OU2YM37K86
- KEGG: D10580
- ChEBI: CHEBI:85188
- ChEMBL: ChEMBL3391662

Chemical and physical data
- Formula: C_{40}H_{43}N_{7}O_{7}S
- Molar mass: 765.89 g·mol^{−1}
- 3D model (JSmol)
- SMILES: Cc1cnc(cn1)C(=O)N[C@H]2CCCCC/C=C\[C@@H]3C[C@]3(NC(=O)[C@@H]4C[C@H](CN4C2=O)Oc5c6ccccc6c7ccccc7n5)C(=O)NS(=O)(=O)C8CC8
- InChI: InChI=1S/C40H43N7O7S/c1-24-21-42-33(22-41-24)35(48)43-32-16-6-4-2-3-5-11-25-20-40(25,39(51)46-55(52,53)27-17-18-27)45-36(49)34-19-26(23-47(34)38(32)50)54-37-30-14-8-7-12-28(30)29-13-9-10-15-31(29)44-37/h5,7-15,21-22,25-27,32,34H,2-4,6,16-20,23H2,1H3,(H,43,48)(H,45,49)(H,46,51)/b11-5-/t25-,26-,32+,34+,40-/m1/s1; Key:UAUIUKWPKRJZJV-QPLHLKROSA-N

Paritaprevir (previously known as ABT-450) is an acylsulfonamide inhibitor of the NS3-4A serine protease manufactured by Abbott Laboratories that shows promising results as a treatment of hepatitis C. When given in combination with ritonavir and ribavirin for 12 weeks, the rate of sustained virologic response at 24 weeks after treatment has been estimated to be 95% for those with hepatitis C virus genotype 1. Resistance to treatment with paritaprevir is uncommon, because it targets the binding site, but has been seen to arise due to mutations at positions 155 and 168 in NS3.

Paritaprevir was a component of Viekira Pak and Technivie. In May 2018, the FDA announced that Technivie and Viekira were to be discontinued. The discontinuation was voluntary and not related to the safety, quality, or efficacy of the medicine. It was estimated that both medications would be available until January 1, 2019.
