= Space folding =

Space folding may refer to:

- Folding (chemistry), the three-dimensional arrangement of complex organic polymers, such as proteins
- Space folding (science fiction), a fictitious method of faster-than-light travel whereby the space-time continuum is "folded"
- Space folding (Dune), the specific portrayal of faster-than-light travel in Frank Herbert's Dune series
- Spacetime curvature due to gravity, a central aspect of the general theory of relativity
- Space-time folding, a physical concept of non-flat spacetime, related to wormholes.
