= Brilacidin =

Chemical compound

Clinical data
- Trade names: None as of July 2012
- ATC code: none

Identifiers
- IUPAC name: N,N'-bis[3-{[5-(carbamimidoylamino)pentanoyl]amino}-2-[(3R)-pyrrolidin-3-yloxy]-5-(trifluoromethyl)phenyl]pyrimidine-4,6-dicarboxamide
- CAS Number: 1224095-98-0
- PubChem CID: 25023695
- ChemSpider: 28651526
- UNII: I1679X069H
- KEGG: D10414
- ChEMBL: ChEMBL2219413
- CompTox Dashboard (EPA): DTXSID90153594

Chemical and physical data
- Formula: C_{40}H_{50}F_{6}N_{14}O_{6}
- Molar mass: 936.922 g·mol^{−1}
- 3D model (JSmol): Interactive image
- SMILES: C1CNC[C@@H]1OC2=C(C=C(C=C2NC(=O)C3=CC(=NC=N3)C(=O)NC4=CC(=CC(=C4O[C@@H]5CCNC5)NC(=O)CCCCNC(=N)N)C(F)(F)F)C(F)(F)F)NC(=O)CCCCNC(=N)N
- InChI: InChI=1S/C40H50F6N14O6/c41-39(42,43)21-13-25(57-31(61)5-1-3-9-53-37(47)48)33(65-23-7-11-51-18-23)27(15-21)59-35(63)29-17-30(56-20-55-29)36(64)60-28-16-22(40(44,45)46)14-26(34(28)66-24-8-12-52-19-24)58-32(62)6-2-4-10-54-38(49)50/h13-17,20,23-24,51-52H,1-12,18-19H2,(H,57,61)(H,58,62)(H,59,63)(H,60,64)(H4,47,48,53)(H4,49,50,54)/t23-,24-/m1/s1; Key:QPDYBCZNGUJZDK-DNQXCXABSA-N

Brilacidin (formerly PMX-30063), an investigational new drug, is a polymer-based antibiotic currently in human clinical trials, and represents a new class of antibiotics called host defense protein mimetics, or HDP-mimetics, which are non-peptide synthetic small molecules modeled after host defense peptides (HDPs). HDPs, also called antimicrobial peptides, some of which are defensins, are part of the innate immune response and are common to most higher forms of life. As brilacidin is modeled after a defensin, it is also called a defensin mimetic.

Brilacidin is an antibiotic that works by disrupting bacterial cell membranes, mimicking defensins that play a role in innate immunity. Several mimics of antimicrobial peptides, both peptides and non-peptides, have been studied, but none have overcome difficulties to reach the market.

== Structure and action ==
Brilacidin, a non-peptide chemical mimic, is an aryl amide foldamer designed to replicate the amphiphilic properties of antimicrobial peptides while solving the problems encountered by peptide-based antimicrobials. Brilacidin, a broad-spectrum antibiotic, has potent Gram positive activity and Gram negative coverage, and is highly effective in treating the 'superbug' methicillin-resistant Staphylococcus aureus (MRSA). Brilacidin has low cytotoxicity against mammalian cells while selectively targeting bacteria, directly and rapidly disrupting their membranes, resulting in the bacteria's death. Due to this unique mechanism of action (mimicking the host's natural immune response, proven to be successful in fighting off infections over millions of years of evolution), bacterial antibiotic resistance is less likely to develop.

== Potential significance ==
There has not been a new drug approval from a new class of antibiotics since 1987. While six antibiotics have been approved over the last year, they are all adaptations of existing antibiotic classes. None of the recently approved novel antibiotics represent entirely new classes. Novel antibiotics are crucial as antibiotic resistance poses a global health risk. The World Health Organization, warning of a "post-antibiotic era" has stated that antimicrobial resistance (AMR) is a "problem so serious that it threatens the achievements of modern medicine".

== History ==
Leveraging advanced computational bioinformatics, brilacidin and other defensin mimetics were first developed by University of Pennsylvania-based researchers. Their efforts were consolidated, and officially incorporated, in 2002, under the company name PolyMedix.

PolyMedix conducted pre-clinical and clinical research with brilacidin through a completed Phase 2a human clinical trial with positive results. After discontinuing a clinical trial for an unrelated compound PolyMedix filed for Chapter 7 bankruptcy protection on 1 April 2013. Cellceutix acquired the PolyMedix assets and intellectual property, including the licenses and patents for brilacidin and the rest of the HDP-mimetic pipeline, from bankruptcy court which on 4 September 2013, approved Cellceutix's stalking horse bid.

On 7 June 2017, Cellceutix Announced a Company Name Change to Innovation Pharmaceuticals Inc. On 9 June 2017, the stock ticker name was effectively changed to "IPIX".

== Clinical trials ==
Innovation Pharmaceuticals advanced brilacidin through early stage human clinical trials to a completed Phase 2a proof-of-concept clinical trial. Since acquisition, brilacidin was entered into a Phase 2b clinical trial. Brilacidin was granted the Qualified Infectious Disease Product (QIDP) designation by the FDA under the Generating Antibiotic Incentives Now Act of 2011 (GAIN Act).

=== Phase 2a clinical trial – ABSSSI ===
Initial Treatment for Acute Bacterial Skin Infections (ABSSSI) Caused by Staphylococcus aureus Randomized, Dose Ranging, Active Controlled Efficacy and Safety Evaluation of PMX-30063 As Initial Treatment for Acute Bacterial Skin and Skin Structure Infections (ABSSSI) Caused by Staphylococcus aureus

The study started in October 2010 and had a primary completion date of December 2011 for final data collection for the primary outcome measure. Overall, 215 patients were randomized into either one of the three brilacidin arms or the active comparator Daptomycin arm. There were three dosing regimens for brilacidin, a low, medium and high dose administered for three days, and one dosing regimen for Daptomycin administered for seven days.

The clinical trial was successful, demonstrating safety and clinical efficacy for all evaluated doses of brilacidin, with three-day brilacidin cure rates of all dosing regimens comparable with seven days of Daptomycin. The results indicated the potential for a shorter brilacidin dosing regimen. Shorter dosing regimens are important as they reduce the risks from Intravenous therapy complications, reduce costs such as reduced hospital stays and clinic visits, and can help reduce the emergence of antibiotic resistance through a combination of a quick bacterial kill, shorter duration of treatment, and increased patient compliance.

=== Phase 2b clinical trial – ABSSSI ===
Efficacy and Safety Study of Brilacidin to Treat Serious Skin Infections

The study started February 2014 and announced completed enrollment 19 August 2014. Overall, 215 patients were randomized to one of three dosing regimens of brilacidin (single dose 0.6 mg/kg; single-dose 0.8 mg/kg; 1.2 mg/kg over 3 days) or 7 days of once daily daptomycin. finding that a single dose brilacidin was comparable to 7 days of daptomycin. The primary endpoint was clinical success in the intent-to-treat population, defined as reduction of at least 20% in area of the ABSSSI lesion, relative to baseline, when observed 48–72 hours after the first dose of study drug, and no rescue antibiotics administered.

=== Phase 2 clinical trial – oral mucositis ===
The brilacidin trial for oral mucositis (Briladidin-OM) has started in May 2015 and is expected to be completed in December 2017. Brilacidin-OM is an oral rinse of brilacidin in water. Approximately 60 patients who received chemoradiation for head and neck cancer were randomized to receive either brilacidin-OM or the placebo three times daily for seven weeks. Various primary and secondary outcome measures were recorded to assess efficacy of brilacidin-OM to prevent or reduce the severity of oral mucositis in patients receiving chemo-radiation.

=== Phase 2 clinical trial – Covid-19 / SARS-CoV-2 ===
The Brilacidin trial for the treatment of COVID-19 infection has started in February 2021 and is expected to be completed in July 2021. The study is a randomized, blinded, placebo-controlled, parallel group design and will accept 120 patients. The placebo or drug will be administered via IV infusion to patients with moderate to severe COVID-19, SARS-CoV-2 infection confirmed by positive standard polymerase chain reaction test (or equivalent/ other approved diagnostic test) within 4 days prior to starting study treatment, and hospitalized with respiratory distress but not yet requiring high-level respiratory support.

== The HDP-mimetic pipeline ==
Development is ongoing for numerous brilacidin analogs, selected by laboratory testing of the various HDP mimetics and defensin-mimetic compounds in the antibiotic pipeline. Pre-clinical research has been shown select brilacidin analogs effective in killing a variety of important Gram-negative pathogens (the so-called superbugs), such as Pseudomonas aeruginosa, Klebsiella pneumoniae, Escherichia coli and Acinetobacter baumannii as well as highly multi-drug resistant ndm-1-producing K. pneumoniae. An abstract update on these efforts was presented at the European Congress of Clinical Microbiology and Infectious Disease (ECCMID) 2015 annual conference. The footnote links to the full presentation. Other HDP-Mimetic analogs have proven effective in vitro against C. albicans and other Candida species.

Also acquired with brilacidin and the HDP-mimetic pipeline were the rights to the related PolyCide family of compounds, polymeric formulations that function as antimicrobial agents. These compounds are similar to brilacidin in that they are also synthetic mimics of HDPs. These compounds have superior bacterial killing activity over triclosan and silver nitrate, common biocidal agents. PolyCide compounds could be used as additives to paints, plastics, textiles and other materials to create self-sterilizing products and surfaces.
