= Folding (chemistry) =

How a molecule assumes its conformation

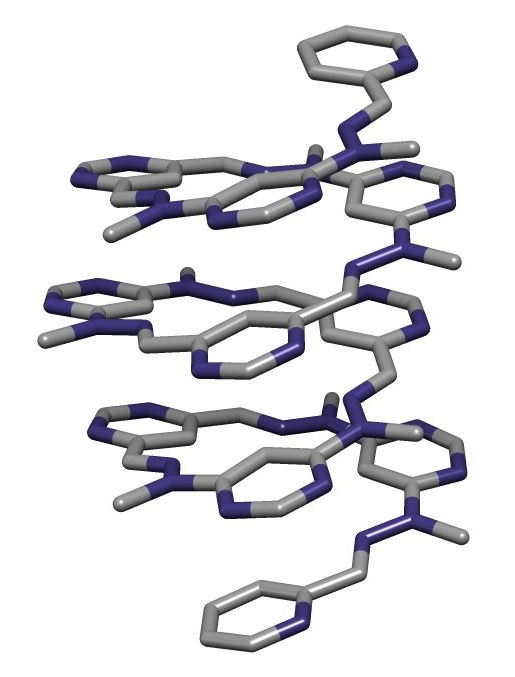
Crystal structure of a foldamer reported by Lehn and coworkers in Helv. Chim. Acta., 2003, 86, 1598–1624.

In chemistry, folding is the process by which a molecule assumes its shape or conformation. The process can also be described as intramolecular self-assembly, a type of molecular self-assembly, where the molecule is directed to form a specific shape through noncovalent interactions, such as hydrogen bonding, metal coordination, hydrophobic forces, van der Waals forces, pi-pi interactions, and electrostatic effects.

The most active area of interest in the folding of molecules is the process of protein folding, which analyses the specific sequences of amino acids in a protein. The shape of the folded protein can be used to understand its function and design drugs to influence the processes that it is involved in.

There is also a great deal of interest in the construction of artificial folding molecules or foldamers. They are studied as models of biological molecules and for potential application to the development of new functional materials.

== See also ==
- Secondary structure
- Tertiary structure
- Circuit topology
