= Sulanemadlin =

Chemical compound

Clinical data
- Other names: ALRN-6924

Legal status
- Legal status: Investigational

Identifiers
- CAS Number: 1451199-98-6
- PubChem CID: 164182053
- DrugBank: DB17285
- UNII: 6BGF28R54M

Chemical and physical data
- Formula: C_{95}H_{140}N_{20}O_{23}
- Molar mass: 1930.282 g·mol^{−1}

Sulanemadlin (development code ALRN-6924) is an experimental drug for the treatment of cancer. It is under development by Aileron Therapeutics, and has been studied in clinical trials for myelodysplastic syndrome and acute myeloid leukemia.

Sulanemadlin is a stapled peptide that mimics the N-terminal domain of p53, a tumor suppressor protein. As such, it binds to MDM2 and MDMX, leading to tumor cell apoptosis.

== Clinical trials ==
Sulanemadlin is notable as the first stapled peptide, a novel pharmaceutical strategy, to enter clinical trials.

Despite its preclinical promise, concerns about side effects, including severe neutropenia, have terminated Phase 1B clinical trials early in at least one trial.
