= Peptoid =

Polymers of N-substituted glycines

Peptoids (root from the Greek πεπτός, peptós "digested"; derived from πέσσειν, péssein "to digest" and the Greek-derived suffix -oid meaning "like, like that of, thing like a ______," ), or poly-N-substituted glycines, are a class of biochemicals known as biomimetics that replicate the behavior of biological molecules. Peptidomimetics are recognizable by side chains that are appended to the nitrogen atom of the peptide backbone, rather than to the α-carbons (as they are in amino acids).

== Chemical structure and synthesis ==
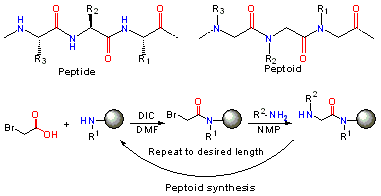
Structure (top) and synthesis (bottom) of peptoids highlighting the submonomer approach.

In peptoids, the side chain is connected to the nitrogen of the peptide backbone, instead of the α-carbon as in peptides. Notably, peptoids lack the amide hydrogen which is responsible for many of the secondary structure elements in peptides and proteins. Peptoids were first invented by Reyna J. Simon, Ronald N. Zuckermann, Paul Bartlett and Daniel V. Santi to mimic protein/peptide products to aid in the discovery of protease-stable small molecule drugs for the East Bay company Chiron.

Following the sub-monomer protocol originally created by Ron Zuckermann, each residue is installed in two steps: acylation and displacement. In the acylation step, a haloacetic acid, typically bromoacetic acid activated by diisopropylcarbodiimide reacts with the amine of the previous residue. In the displacement step (a classical S_{N}2 reaction), an amine displaces the halide to form the N-substituted glycine residue. The submonomer approach allows the use of any commercially available or synthetically accessible amine with great potential for combinatorial chemistry.

== Unique characteristics ==
Like D-Peptides and β peptides, peptoids are completely resistant to proteolysis, and are therefore advantageous for therapeutic applications where proteolysis is a major issue. Since secondary structure in peptoids does not involve hydrogen bonding, it is not typically denatured by solvent, temperature, or chemical denaturants such as urea (see details below).

Notably, since the amino portion of the amino acid results from the use of any amine, thousands of commercially available amines can be used to generate unprecedented chemical diversity at each position at costs far lower than would be required for similar peptides or peptidomimetics. To date, at least 230 different amines have been used as side chains in peptoids.

== Structure ==
Peptoid oligomers are known to be conformationally unstable, due to the flexibility of the main-chain methylene groups and the absence of stabilizing hydrogen bond interactions along the backbone. Nevertheless, through the choice of appropriate side chains it is possible to form specific steric or electronic interactions that favour the formation of stable secondary structures like helices, especially peptoids with C-α-branched side chains are known to adopt structure analogous to polyproline I helix. Different strategies have been employed to predict and characterize peptoid secondary structure, with the ultimate goal of developing fully folded peptoid protein structures The cis/trans amide bond isomerization still leads to a conformational heterogeneity which doesn’t allow for the formation of homogeneous peptoid foldamers. Nonetheless, scientists were able to find trans-inducer N-Aryl side chains promoting polyproline type II helix, and strong cis-inducer such as bulky naphtylethyl and tert-butyl side chains. It was also found that n→π* interactions can modulate the ratio of cis/trans amide bond conformers, until reaching a complete control of the cis conformer in the peptoid backbone using a functionalizable triazolium side chain.

== Applications ==
The first demonstration of the use of peptoids was in screening a combinatorial library of diverse peptoids, which yielded novel high-affinity ligands for 7-transmembrane G-protein-couple receptors.

Peptoids have been developed as candidates for a range of different biomedical applications, including antimicrobial agents, synthetic lung surfactants, ligands for various proteins including Src Homology 3 (SH3 domain), Vascular Endothelial Growth Factor (VEGF) receptor 2, and antibody Immunoglobulin G biomarkers for the identification of Alzheimer's disease.

Due to their advantageous characteristics as described above, peptoids are also being actively developed for use in nanotechnology, an area in which they may play an important role.

=== Antimicrobial agents ===
Researchers supported by grants from the NIH and NIAID tested the efficacy of antimicrobial peptoids against antibiotic-resistant strands of Mycobacterium tuberculosis. Antimicrobial peptoids demonstrate a non-specific mechanism of action against the bacterial membrane, one that differs from small-molecule antibiotics that bind to specific receptors (and thus are susceptible to mutations or alterations in bacterial structure). Preliminary results suggested "appreciable activity" against drug-sensitive bacterial strands, leading to a call for more research into the viability of peptoids as a new class of tuberculocidal drugs.

Researchers at the Barron Lab at Stanford University (supported by a NIH Pioneer Award grant) are currently studying whether upregulation of the human host defense peptide LL-37 or application of antimicrobial treatments based on LL-37 may prevent or treat sporadic Alzheimer’s dementia. Lead researcher Annelise Barron discovered that the innate human defense peptide LL-37 binds to the peptide Ab, which is associated with Alzheimer's disease. Barron's insight is that an imbalance between LL-37 and Ab may be a critical factor affecting AD-associated fibrils and plaques. The project extends focus upon the potential relationship between chronic, oral P. gingivalis and herpesvirus (HSV-1) infections to the progression of Alzheimer's dementia.

== See also ==
- Peptidomimetic
- Beta-peptide
- Peptoid Nanosheet
