= Ritonavir =

Antiretroviral medication

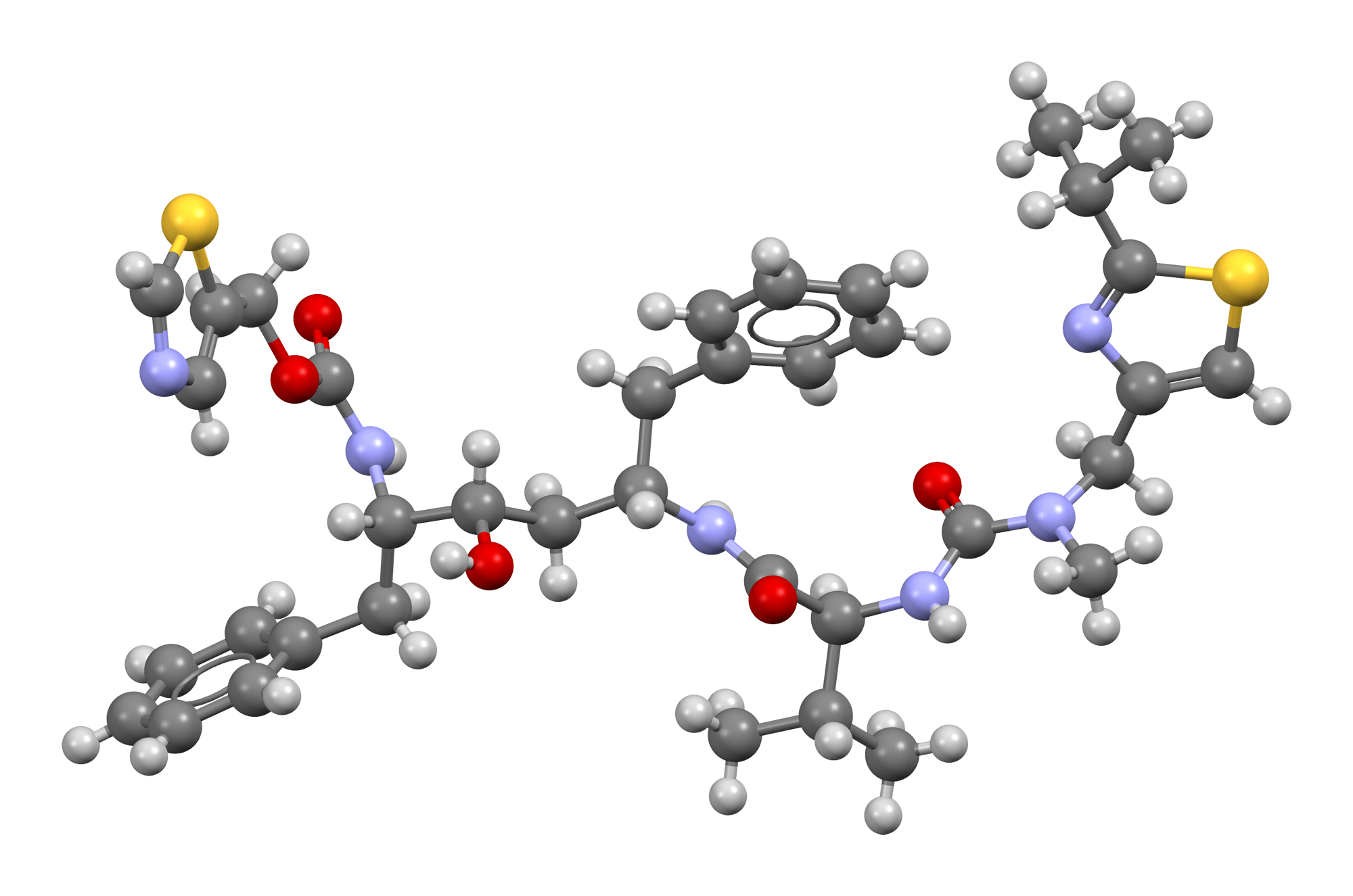

Clinical data
- Pronunciation: /rɪˈtɒnəˌvɪər/ rih-TO-nə-veer
- Trade names: Norvir
- Other names: RTV
- AHFS/Drugs.com: Monograph
- MedlinePlus: a696029
- License data: EU EMA: by INN; US DailyMed: Ritonavir
- Pregnancy category: AU: B3
- Routes of administration: By mouth
- ATC code: J05AE03 (WHO)

Legal status
- Legal status: AU: S4 (Prescription only); CA: ℞-only; UK: POM (Prescription only); US: ℞-only; EU: Rx-only

Pharmacokinetic data
- Protein binding: 98–99%
- Metabolism: Liver, CYP3A4
- Elimination half-life: 3–4 hours
- Excretion: Mostly fecal

Identifiers
- IUPAC name: 1,3-thiazol-5-ylmethyl N-[(2S,3S,5S)-3-hydroxy-5-[(2S)-3-methyl-2-{[methyl({[2-(propan-2-yl)-1,3-thiazol-4-yl]methyl})carbamoyl]amino}butanamido]-1,6-diphenylhexan-2-yl]carbamate
- CAS Number: 155213-67-5
- PubChem CID: 392622
- DrugBank: DB00503
- ChemSpider: 347980
- UNII: O3J8G9O825
- KEGG: D00427
- ChEBI: CHEBI:45409
- ChEMBL: ChEMBL163
- NIAID ChemDB: 028478
- PDB ligand: RIT (PDBe, RCSB PDB)
- CompTox Dashboard (EPA): DTXSID1048627
- ECHA InfoCard: 100.125.710

Chemical and physical data
- Formula: C_{37}H_{48}N_{6}O_{5}S_{2}
- Molar mass: 720.95 g·mol^{−1}
- 3D model (JSmol): Interactive image
- SMILES: CC(C)c4nc(CN(C)C(=O)N[C@@H](C(C)C)C(=O)N[C@@H](Cc1ccccc1)C[C@H](O)[C@H](Cc2ccccc2)NC(=O)OCc3cncs3)cs4
- InChI: InChI=1S/C37H48N6O5S2/c1-24(2)33(42-36(46)43(5)20-29-22-49-35(40-29)25(3)4)34(45)39-28(16-26-12-8-6-9-13-26)18-32(44)31(17-27-14-10-7-11-15-27)41-37(47)48-21-30-19-38-23-50-30/h6-15,19,22-25,28,31-33,44H,16-18,20-21H2,1-5H3,(H,39,45)(H,41,47)(H,42,46)/t28-,31-,32-,33-/m0/s1; Key:NCDNCNXCDXHOMX-XGKFQTDJSA-N

Ritonavir, sold under the brand name Norvir, is an antiretroviral medication used along with other medications to treat HIV/AIDS. This combination treatment is known as highly active antiretroviral therapy (HAART). Ritonavir is a protease inhibitor, though it now mainly serves to boost the potency of other protease inhibitors. It may also be used in combination with other medications to treat hepatitis C and COVID-19. It is taken by mouth.

Common side effects of ritonavir include nausea, vomiting, loss of appetite, diarrhea, and numbness of the hands and feet. Serious side effects include liver complications, pancreatitis, allergic reactions, and arrhythmias. Serious interactions may occur with a number of other medications including amiodarone and simvastatin. At low doses, it is considered to be acceptable for use during pregnancy. Ritonavir is of the protease inhibitor class. However, it is also commonly used to inhibit the enzyme that metabolizes other protease inhibitors. This inhibition allows lower doses of these latter medications to be used.

Ritonavir was patented in 1989 and came into medical use in 1996. It is on the World Health Organization's List of Essential Medicines. Ritonavir capsules were approved as a generic medication in the United States in 2020.

== Medical uses ==
=== HIV/AIDS ===
Ritonavir was initially approved in 1996 as a standalone antiretroviral protease inhibitor for the treatment of HIV-1 infection. Early pharmacokinetic and pharmacodynamic (PK-PD) observations revealed that while high-dose monotherapy (such as 600 mg twice daily) was effective at suppressing viral replication, it was associated with significant gastrointestinal toxicity and the rapid emergence of drug-resistant viral strains.

However, researchers discovered that ritonavir is one of the most potent known inhibitors of the cytochrome P450 3A4 (CYP3A4) enzyme. Administering it at much lower doses (100–200 mg) significantly slows the metabolism of other co-administered drugs, boosting their plasma concentrations and extending their half-lives without causing severe side effects. Consequently, ritonavir's clinical application shifted; it is rarely used today for its independent antiviral activity. Instead, it is indicated almost exclusively as a pharmacokinetic enhancer (or "booster") in combination therapy alongside other, primary protease inhibitors (such as lopinavir, darunavir, or atazanavir) to improve their efficacy and reduce the pill burden for patients.

=== COVID-19 ===
The pharmacokinetic boosting property of ritonavir has been successfully repurposed for the treatment of COVID-19. It is co-packaged with nirmatrelvir, a SARS-CoV-2 main protease (3CLpro) inhibitor, under the brand name Paxlovid. In this combination regimen, ritonavir has no direct activity against SARS-CoV-2; rather, it inhibits the CYP3A4-mediated metabolism of nirmatrelvir, enhancing its systemic exposure to levels sufficient to halt viral replication. Clinical trials demonstrated that this combination significantly reduced the risk of hospitalization or death in high-risk patients when administered early (within five days of symptom onset), leading to emergency use authorizations and approvals by agencies such as the US Food and Drug Administration (FDA) and the World Health Organization (WHO).

=== Hepatitis C ===
Ritonavir is also utilized as a pharmacokinetic booster in direct-acting antiviral regimens for the treatment of Hepatitis C (HCV). It is formulated in combination with paritaprevir and ombitasvir (and sometimes dasabuvir), where ritonavir boosts the systemic levels of paritaprevir to maintain effective antiviral concentrations, achieving high sustained virological response rates with a manageable safety profile.

== Side effects ==
When administered at the initially tested higher doses effective for anti-HIV therapy, the side effects of ritonavir are those shown below.

- Asthenia, malaise
- Diarrhea
- Nausea and vomiting
- Abdominal pain
- Dizziness
- Insomnia
- Kidney failure
- Sweating
- Taste abnormality
- Metabolic effects, including
  - Hypercholesterolemia
  - Hypertriglyceridemia
  - Elevated transaminases
  - Elevated creatine kinase

=== Adverse drug reactions ===
Ritonavir exhibits hepatic activity. It induces CYP1A2 and inhibits CYP3A4 and CYP2D6. Concomitant therapy of ritonavir with a variety of medications may result in serious and sometimes fatal drug interactions.

Due to it being a strong inhibitor (that causes at least a five-fold increase in the plasma AUC values, or more than 80% decrease in clearance) of both cytochrome P450 enzymes CYP2D6 and CYP3A4, ritonavir can severely potentiate and prolong the half-life and/or increase the blood concentration of phenobarbital, primidone, carbamazepine, phenytoin, PDE5 inhibitors like sildenafil, opioids such as hydrocodone, oxycodone, pethidine and fentanyl, antiarrhythmic agents such as amiodarone, propafenone and disopyramide, immunosuppressants such as tacrolimus, voclosporin and sirolimus, neuroleptics like lurasidone and pimozide, as well as some chemotherapeutic agents, benzodiazepines and some ergot derivatives. The FDA has issued a boxed warning for this type of drug interaction.

CYP3A4 inducers can counteract the inhibiting effects of ritonavir and lead to drastically reduced levels of "boosted" drugs, increasing the risk of developing drug resistance. Other CYP3A4 inhibitors may have an additive effect with ritonavir, causing increased drug levels.

== Pharmacology ==
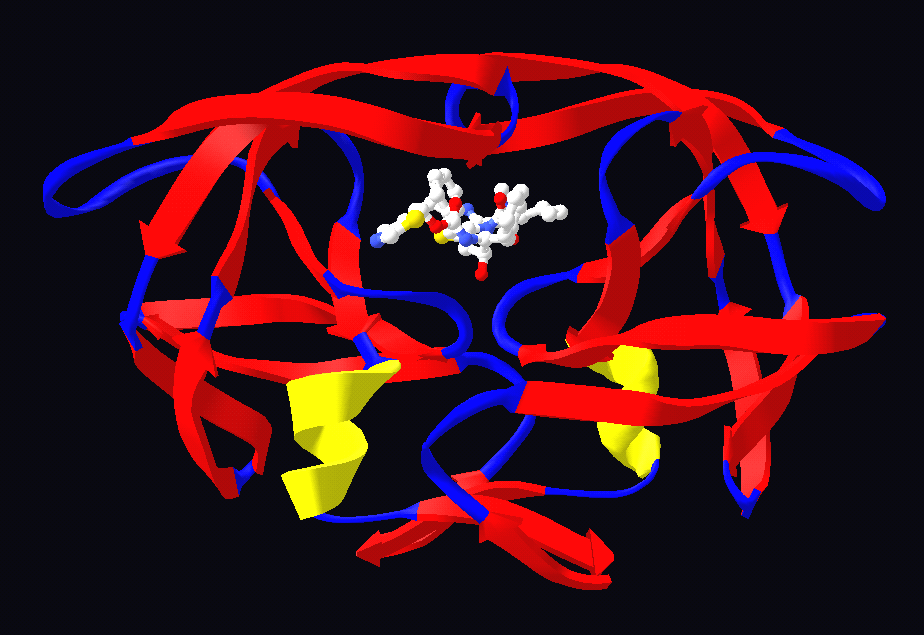
Ritonavir (center) bound to the active site of HIV protease

=== Pharmacodynamics ===
==== HIV protease binding ====
Ritonavir is a pseudo-C_{2}-symmetric peptidomimetic inhibitor of the HIV-1 protease. It acts as a tight-binding, active-site titrant with an inhibition constant (K_{i}) of 15 pM. At a structural level, the P3 isopropylthiazolyl group of ritonavir projects directly into the enzyme's active site to form critical hydrophobic interactions with the side chain of the Valine-82 (V82) residue. Resistance to ritonavir occurs when the viral protease gene develops mutations that distort this binding pocket; these amino acid substitutions generally occur in a stepwise fashion at specific positions, including V82A, V82F, V82T, and V82S.

==== CYP3A4 inhibition ====
Although initially developed as an antiviral, ritonavir is now primarily utilized as a pharmacokinetic enhancer (or "booster") because it is a highly potent inhibitor of the cytochrome P450 3A4 (CYP3A4) enzyme. By inhibiting CYP3A4, ritonavir prevents the metabolic breakdown of co-administered drugs (such as nirmatrelvir or lopinavir), thereby increasing their plasma concentrations and extending their therapeutic efficacy.

The structural key to this inhibition is the unsubstituted P2' 5-thiazolyl group of ritonavir; the unhindered nitrogen atom on this specific thiazole ring binds directly to the heme iron inside the CYP3A4 active site. Researchers have proposed four primary mechanisms by which ritonavir achieves its quasi-irreversible inactivation of CYP3A4:

- Formation of a metabolic-intermediate complex (MIC) that coordinates tightly to the heme group.
- Strong ligation of unmodified ritonavir directly to the heme iron.
- Heme destruction followed by the formation of a heme-protein adduct.
- Covalent attachment of a reactive ritonavir intermediate directly to the CYP3A4 apoprotein, specifically at the Lysine-257 (Lys257) residue.

Current evidence suggests ritonavir likely exerts its potent inhibitory effects through a mixed mechanism involving several of these pathways simultaneously.

In addition to CYP3A4 inhibition, ritonavir induces the expression of several other enzymes (including CYP1A2, CYP2B6, CYP2C9, and CYP2C19) via the activation of the pregnane X receptor (PXR). It also acts as an inhibitor of key drug transporters, including P-glycoprotein (P-gp), Breast Cancer Resistance Protein (BCRP), and Organic Anion-Transporting Polypeptides (OATP1B1, OATP1B3, and OATP2B1).

=== Pharmacokinetics ===
==== Absorption ====
The intestinal absorption of ritonavir requires an aqueous solubility threshold of greater than 1–2 µg/mL, which the drug achieves via an N-methylurea linker that allows it to be formulated for oral administration. The absolute bioavailability in humans has not been definitively established, though animal models indicate an absolute bioavailability between 74% and 76.4%.

==== Distribution ====
Following a 600 mg oral dose, peak plasma concentrations (C_{max}) are achieved in approximately 2 hours under fasting conditions and 4 hours under non-fasting conditions. The presence of food alters absorption; the bioavailability of the tablet formulation decreases by 21–23% under moderate to high-fat conditions relative to fasting conditions.

Ritonavir is highly bound (98–99%) to human serum proteins, primarily binding to serum albumin and α_{1}-acid glycoprotein over a concentration range of 0.01 to 30 µg/mL. This extensive protein binding attenuates its free antiviral activity in vitro by approximately 20-fold. The drug exhibits a volume of distribution (V_{d}) of 0.41 ± 0.25 L/kg.

==== Metabolism ====
Ritonavir is extensively metabolized by the liver, driven predominantly by the CYP3A enzyme family, with minor contributions from CYP2D6. The biotransformation yields four major metabolites via pathways including N-demethylation, hydroxylation of the isopropyl side chain, and cleavage of the terminal thiazole groups. The primary metabolite is the isopropylthiazole oxidation metabolite (M-2), which retains antiviral activity comparable to the parent drug but circulates at very low plasma concentrations.

==== Elimination ====
The drug exhibits non-linear pharmacokinetics. Upon multiple dosing, the accumulation of ritonavir is lower than predicted from a single dose, which is possibly due to a time- and dose-related increase in drug clearance. The circulating half-life of ritonavir is typically 3 to 5 hours.

Elimination occurs primarily via the feces (86.4 ± 2.9%, with 33.8 ± 10.8% excreted as unchanged parent drug), while a smaller fraction is excreted in the urine (11.3 ± 2.8%, with 3.5 ± 1.8% as unchanged parent drug).

== Chemistry ==
=== Discovery ===
Ritonavir (initially designated as ABT-538) was developed through the systematic structural modification of A-80987, a moderately potent, symmetry-based HIV protease inhibitor. While A-80987 demonstrated good oral bioavailability, its clinical utility was limited by a very short circulating half-life. This rapid clearance was primarily driven by the oxidative metabolism (specifically N-oxidation) of its pyridyl end groups by cytochrome P450 enzymes in the liver and intestine.

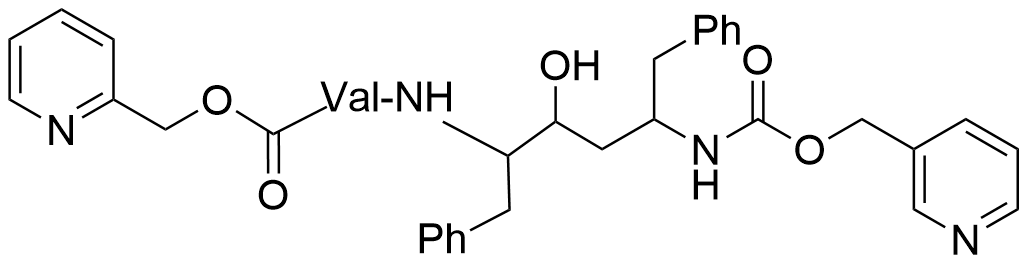
Chemical structure of A-80987, precursor to ritonavir. Notice the two pyridyl end groups.

To slow this metabolic degradation and improve the drug's pharmacokinetic profile, researchers sought to replace the highly oxidizable pyridyl groups with more electron-deficient heterocyclic. This led to the following key structural optimizations:

- Thiazolyl Substitution: The pyridyl groups of A-80987 were replaced with thiazole groups. This modification successfully decreased the rate of hepatic metabolism, because the thiazole groups are not susceptible of N-oxidation.
- Increased Potency: The addition of the P3 isopropyl group created a new hydrophobic interaction with the side chain of valine-82 (V82) in the active site of the HIV protease, which increased the drug's in vitro antiviral potency by about 10-fold compared to A-80987.
- Solubility Enhancements: Because thiazole has a lower pKa than pyridine, the aqueous solubility of the new analogues dropped, which threatened to limit intestinal absorption. To counteract this, researchers utilized an N-methylurea linker instead of a carbamatel inkage. This restored sufficient aqueous solubility to permit effective oral absorption.

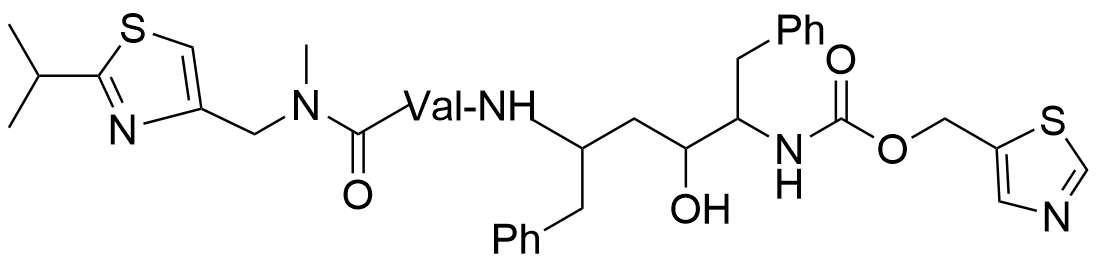
Structure of ritonavir featuring terminal thiazole groups designed to resist rapid hepatic metabolism.

The culmination of these structural changes resulted in ritonavir, a highly potent inhibitor that produced high, sustained plasma concentrations capable of profoundly suppressing viral replication in vivo.

=== Synthesis ===
Full details of the synthesis of ritonavir were first published by scientists from Abbott Laboratories.

In the first step shown, an aldehyde derived from phenylalanine is treated with zinc dust in the presence of vanadium(III) chloride. This results in a pinacol coupling reaction which dimerizes the material to provide an intermediate which is converted to its epoxide and then reduced to (2S,3S,5S)-2,5-diamino-1,6-diphenylhexan-3-ol. Importantly, this retains the absolute stereochemistry of the amino acid precursor. The diamine is then treated sequentially with two thiazole derivatives, each linked by an amide bond, to provide ritonavir.

=== Chemical properties ===
The following table summarizes the main chemical properties of ritonavir.

Property	Value	Unit	Source
Molecular Weight	720.9	g/mol	
logP	3.9	-	
Water Solubility	0.00126	mg/mL	
Basic pKa	2.84	-	
Acidic pKa	13.68		
Refractivity	194.59	m^3·mol-1	
Polarizability	76.23	A^3	

== History ==
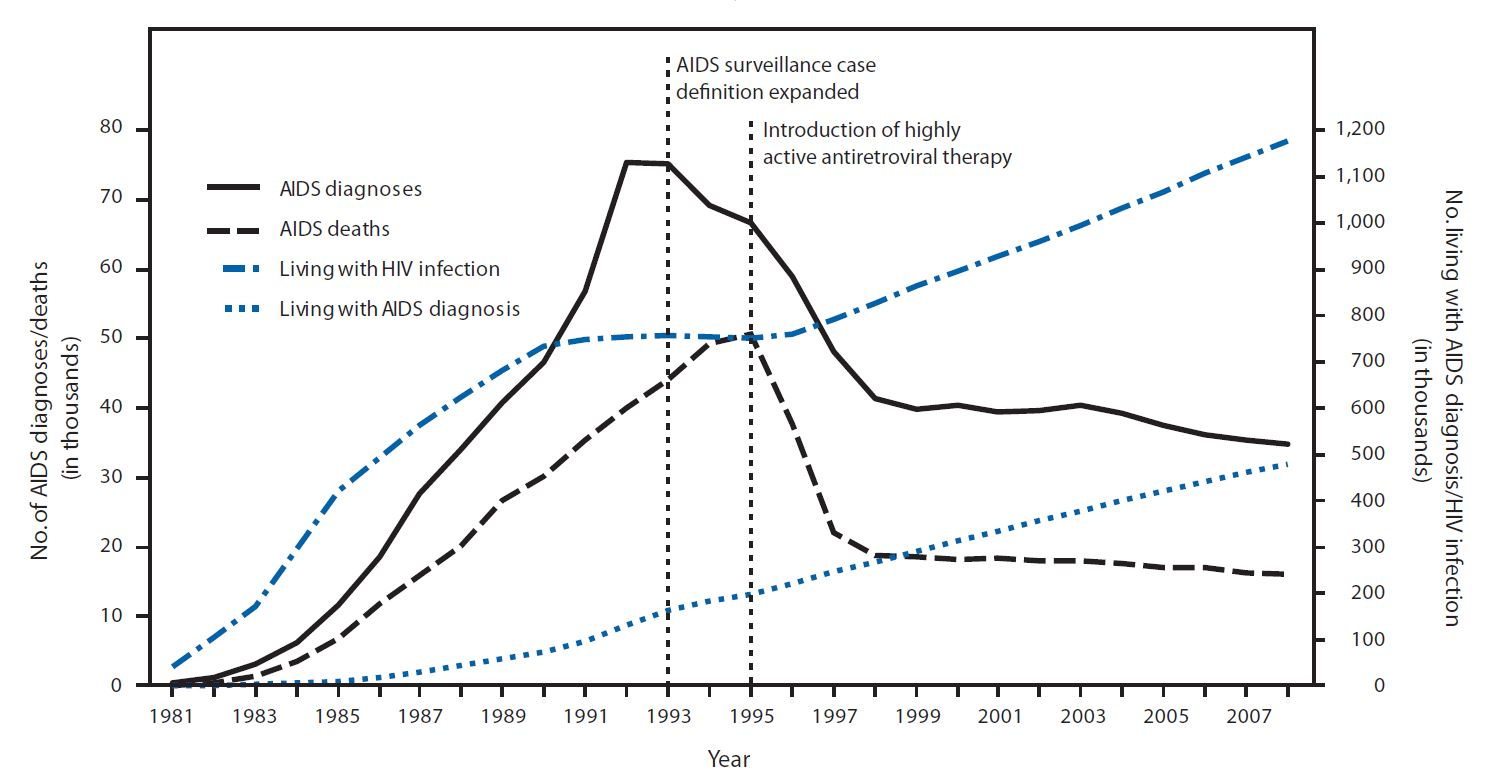
New HIV infections and deaths, before and after the FDA approval of "highly active antiretroviral therapy", of which saquinavir and ritonavir were key as the first two protease inhibitors. As a result of the new therapies, HIV deaths in the United States fell dramatically within two years.

Ritonavir is sold as Norvir by AbbVie, Inc. The US Food and Drug Administration (FDA) approved ritonavir on March 1, 1996, As a result of the introduction of "highly active antiretroviral thearap[ies]" the annual U.S. HIV-associated death rate fell from over 50,000 to about 18,000 over a period of two years.

In 2014, the FDA approved a combination of ombitasvir/paritaprevir/ritonavir for the treatment of hepatitis C virus (HCV) genotype 4.

After the start of the COVID pandemic in 2020, many antivirals, including protease inhibitors in general and ritonavir in particular, were repurposed in an effort to treat the new infection. Lopinavir/ritonavir was found not to work in severe COVID-19. Virtual screening followed by molecular dynamics analysis predicted ritonavir blocks the binding of the SARS-CoV-2 spike (S) protein to the human angiotensin-converting enzyme 2 (hACE2) receptor, which is critical for the virus entry into human cells.

Finally in 2021, a combination of ritonavir with nirmatrelvir, a newly developed orally active 3C-like protease inhibitor, was developed for the treatment of COVID-19. Ritonavir serves to slow down metabolism of nirmatrelvir by cytochrome enzymes to maintain higher circulating concentrations of the main drug. In November that year, Pfizer announced positive phase 2/3 results, including 89% reduction in hospitalizations when given within three days after symptom onset.

=== Polymorphism and temporary market withdrawal ===
Ritonavir was originally dispensed as a capsule that did not require refrigeration. This contained a crystal form of ritonavir that is now called form I. However, like many drugs, crystalline ritonavir can exhibit polymorphism, i.e., the same molecule can crystallize into more than one crystal type, or polymorph, each of which contains the same repeating molecule but in different crystal packings/arrangements. The solubility and hence the bioavailability can vary in the different arrangements, and this was observed for forms I and II of ritonavir.

During its development prior to 1996, only the form I crystal structure of ritonavir was discovered. A new polymorph, form II, was discovered in 1998 which had a lower free energy and higher stability. This more stable crystal form was less soluble, which resulted in significantly lower bioavailability. The compromised oral bioavailability of the drug led to temporary removal of the oral capsule formulation from the market. As a consequence of the fact that even a trace amount of form II can result in the conversion of the more bioavailable form I into form II, the presence of form II threatened the ruin of existing supplies of the oral capsule formulation of ritonavir; and indeed, form II was found in production lines, effectively halting ritonavir production. Abbott withdrew the capsules from the market, and prescribing physicians were encouraged to switch to a Norvir suspension. It has been estimated that Abbott lost more than US$250 million as a result, and the incident is often cited as a high-profile example of disappearing polymorphs.

In 1999, the company's research and development teams ultimately solved the problem by replacing the capsule formulation with a refrigerated gelcap. In 2000, Abbott received FDA-approval for a tablet formulation of lopinavir/ritonavir (Kaletra) which contained a preparation of ritonavir that did not require refrigeration. Ritonavir tablets produced in an amorphous (non-crystalline) solid dispersion by melt-extrusion were introduced commercially in 2010.

== Society and culture ==
=== Economics ===
In 2003, Abbott (AbbVie, Inc.) raised the price of a Norvir course from US$1.71 per day to US$8.57 per day, leading to claims of price gouging by patients' groups and some members of Congress. Consumer group Essential Inventions petitioned the NIH to override the Norvir patent, but the NIH announced on August 4, 2004, that it lacked the legal right to allow generic production of Norvir.
