= Beta-peptide =

Class of peptides derived from β-amino acids

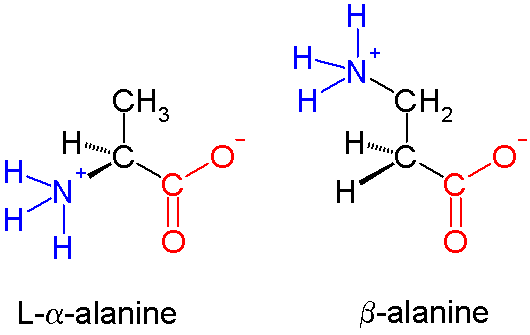
β-alanine, an example of a β-amino acid. The amino group attaches not to the α carbon but to the β-carbon, which in this case is a methylene group.

Beta-peptides (β-peptides) are peptides derived from β-amino acids, in which the amino group is attached to the β-carbon (i.e. the carbon two atoms away from the carboxylate group). The parent β-amino acid is β-alanine (H_{2}NCH_{2}CH_{2}CO_{2}H), a common natural substance, but most examples feature substituents in place of one or more C-H bonds. β-peptides usually do not occur in nature. β-Peptide-based antibiotics are being explored as ways of evading antibiotic resistance. Early studies in this field were published in 1996 by the group of Dieter Seebach and that of Samuel Gellman.

== Structure ==
As there are two carbon atoms available for substitution, β-amino acids have four sites (chirality included; as opposed to two in α-amino acids) for attaching the organic residue group. Accordingly, two main types β-amino acids exist differing by which carbon the residue is attached to: ones with the organic residue (R) next to the amine are called β^{3} and those with position next to the carbonyl group are called β^{2}. A β-peptide can consist of only one kind of these amino acids (β^{2}-peptides and β^{3}-peptides), or have a combination of the two. Furthermore, a β-amino acid can form a ring using both of its sites and also be incorporated into a peptide.

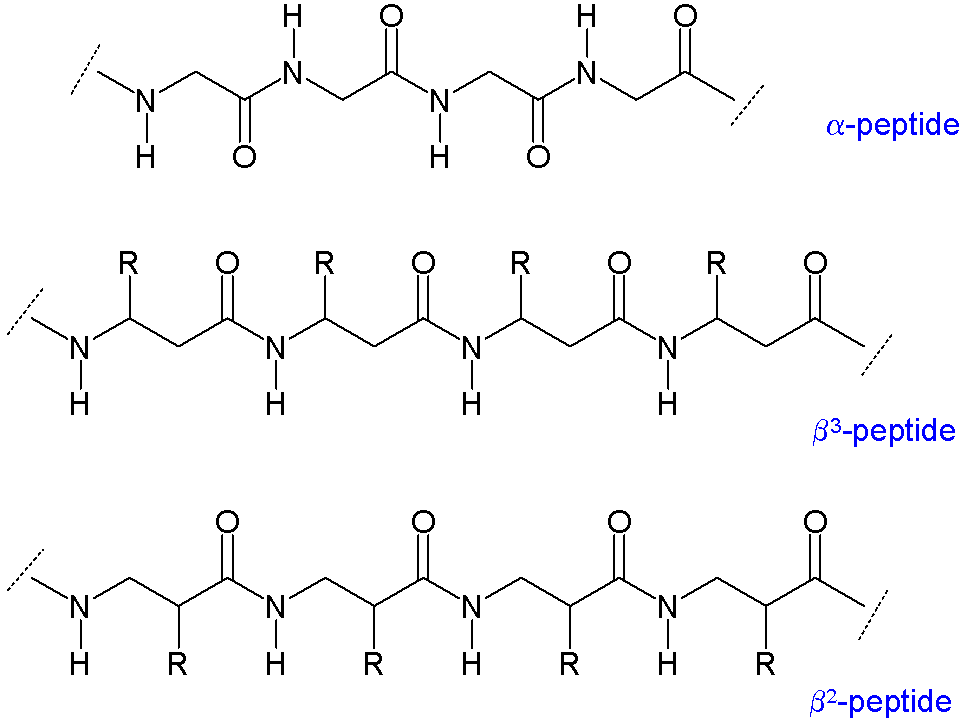

== Synthesis ==
β-Amino acids have been prepared by many routes, including some based on the Arndt-Eistert synthesis.

== Secondary structure ==
Because their backbones are longer than those of normal peptides, β-peptides form disparate secondary structures. The alkyl substituents at both the α and β positions in a β-amino acid favor a gauche conformation about the bond between the α-carbon and β-carbon. This also affects the thermodynamic stability of the structure.

Many types of helix structures consisting of β-peptides have been reported. These conformation types are distinguished by the number of atoms in the hydrogen-bonded ring that is formed in solution; 8-helix, 10-helix, 12-helix, 14-helix, and 10/12-helix have been reported. Generally speaking, β-peptides form a more stable helix than α-peptides.

== Clinical potential ==
β-Peptides are stable against proteolytic degradation in vitro and in vivo, a potential advantage over natural peptides. β-Peptides have been used to mimic natural peptide-based antibiotics such as magainins, which are highly potent but difficult to use as drugs because they are degraded by proteolytic enzymes.

== Examples ==
β-Amino acids with a wide variety of substituents exist. Named by analogy to the biological α-amino acids, the following have been found naturally: β-alanine, β-leucine, β-lysine, β-arginine, β-glutamate, β-glutamine, β-phenylalanine and β-tyrosine. Of these, β-alanine is found in mammals and incorporated in pantothenic acid, an essential nutrient. Aspartic acid is structurally a β-amino acids. Microcystins are a class of compounds containing a β-isoaspartyl (i.e. aspartic acid linked with its beta-carboxyl) residue.

== See also ==
- Peptidomimetic
